= List of landscape architects =

A landscape architect is someone who practices landscape architecture. Regulations of the profession vary by country and state. The terminology has evolved to include those once known as landscape gardeners, landscape or garden designers, architects, surveyors, or civil engineers. In particular, this includes people from the 19th century who practiced before the term "landscape architect" was coined.

Landscape architecture was also differentiated as a profession in the United States earlier than other parts of the world, but this ambiguity has persisted to the present day. In much of Europe, for example, landscape architecture is not a distinct profession; but there are many significant historical and contemporary examples of "landscape architectural design" projects.

Though their influence on landscape architecture may be great, this list precludes gardeners, botanists, writers, theoreticians, ecologists, artists, and others who did not practice landscape design at a site scale and were not trained as a historical "landscape gardener" or contemporary "landscape architect."

== A ==
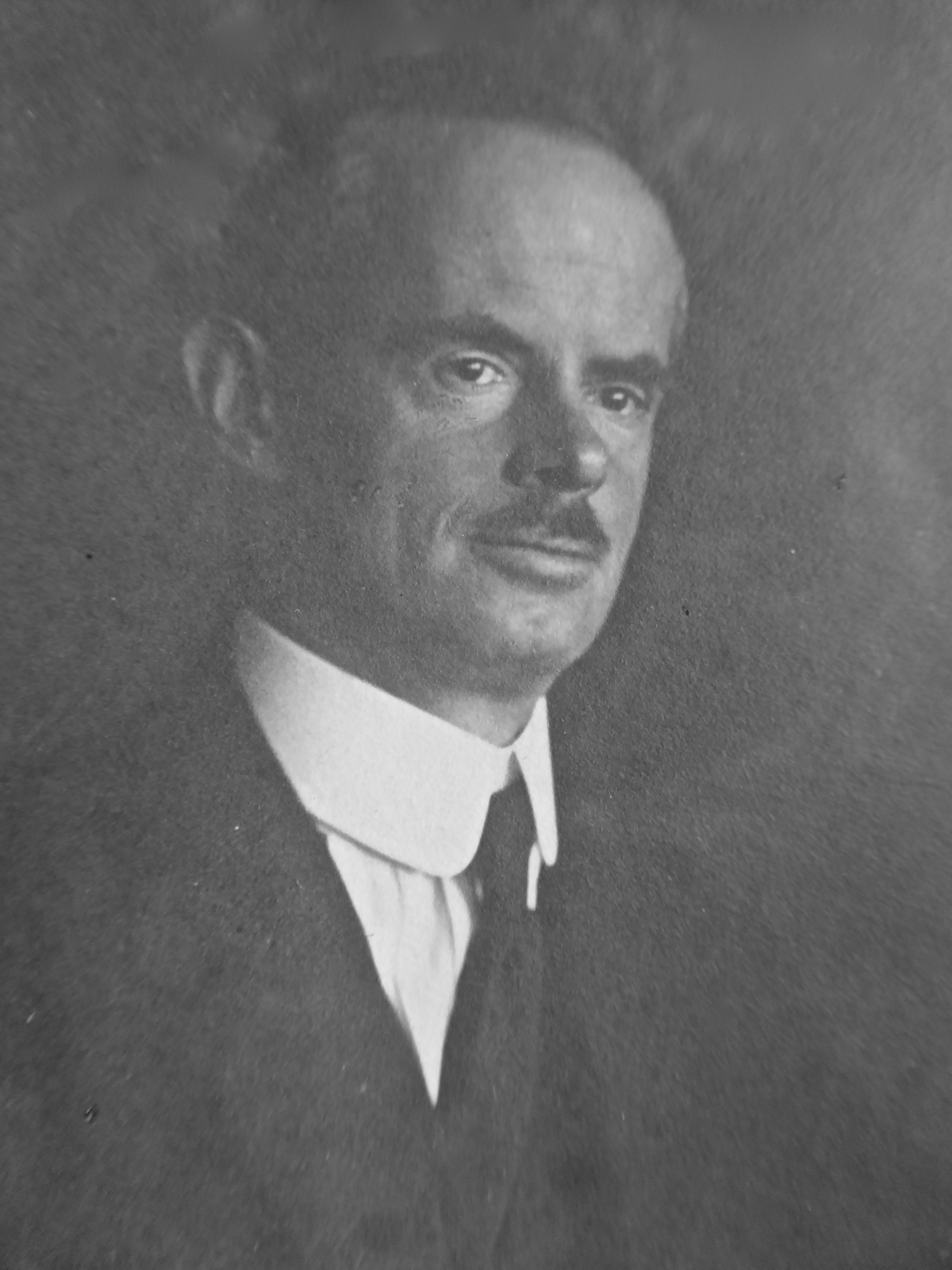
Swiss architect Gustav Ammann

- Jellal Abdelkafi (b. 1939)
- Eishin Adachi (安達永真, b. 1968)
- Madeline Agar (1874‍–‍1967)
- Akashi Isematsu (明石伊勢松, 1881‍–‍1961)
- Charlie Albone (b. c. 1981)
- Jules Allemand (1856‍–‍1916)
- Marjory Allen (1897‍–‍1976)
- Nellie B. Allen (1874‍–‍1961)
- Adolphe Alphand (1817‍–‍1891)
- Gustav Ammann (1885‍–‍1955)
- Charles Morris Anderson (b. 1957)
- Stig Lennart Andersson (b. 1957)
- Édouard André (1840‍–‍1911)
- Aoyagi Shigeki (青柳志解樹, 1929‍–‍2021)
- Aoshima Toshihiro (青島利浩)
- Yoshikuni Araki (1921‍–‍1997)
- Mai Kitazawa Arbegast (1922‍–‍2012)
- Johann August Arens (1757‍–‍1806)
- Ariga Ichirō (有賀一郎, b. 1949)
- Shlomo Aronson (1936‍–‍2018)
- Asano Mitsuyoshi (浅野三義, 1914‍–‍1988)
- Ashizawa Takumi (芦澤拓実, b. 1946)
- Maria Auböck (b. 1951)

== B ==
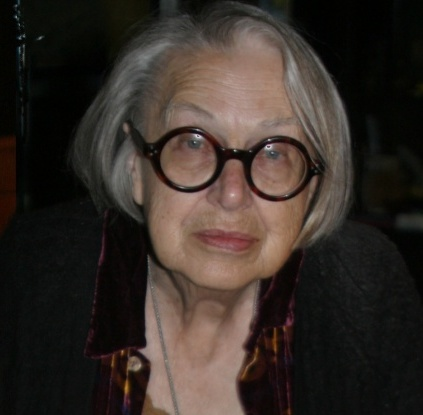
American architect Cleo Baldon

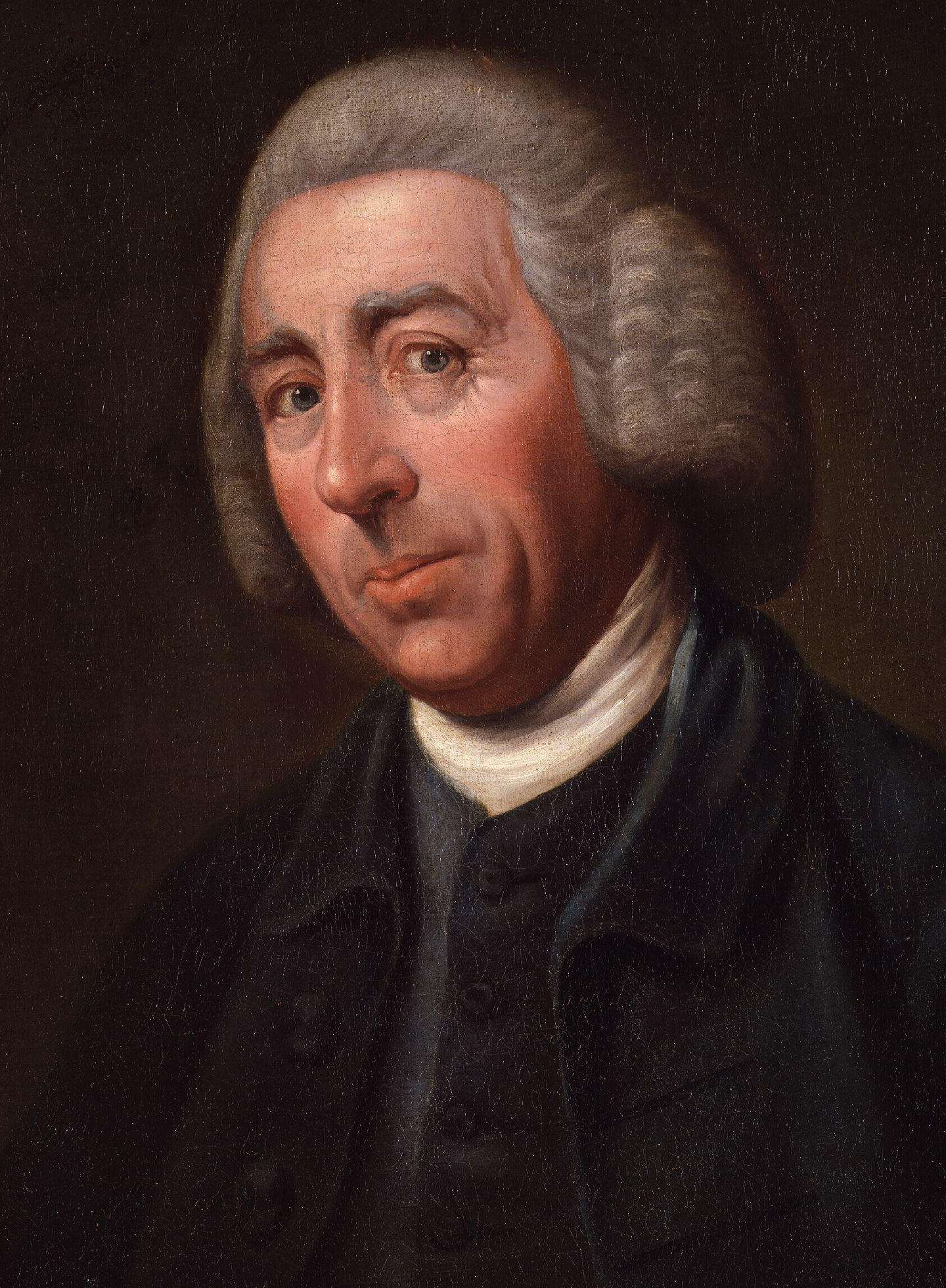
English architect Capability Brown

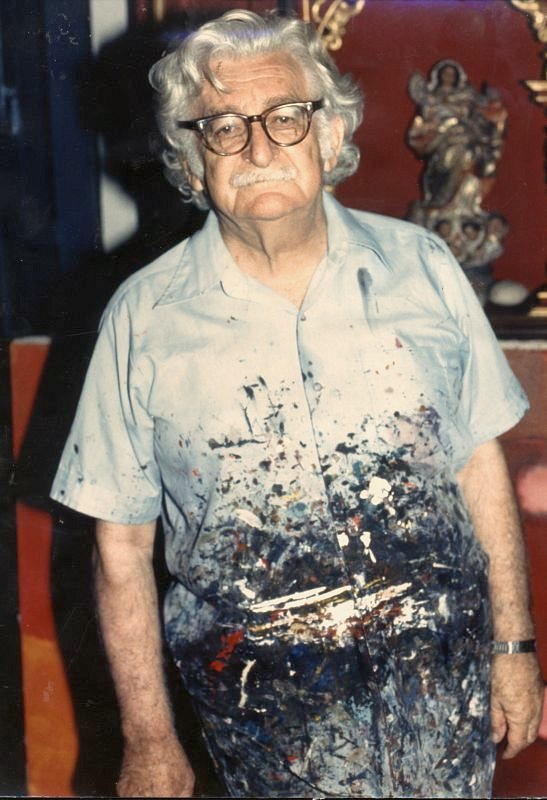
Brazilian architect Roberto Burle Marx

- Mabel Keyes Babcock (1862‍–‍1931)
- Horst Baeseler (1930‍–‍2004)
- Francesco Bagnara (1784‍–‍1866)
- Cleo Baldon (1927‍–‍2014)
- Diana Balmori (1932‍–‍2016)
- Thomas Balsley (b. 1943)
- Garnet Baltimore (1859‍–‍1946)
- Giuseppe Balzaretto (1801‍–‍1874)
- Ruth Bancroft (1908‍–‍2017)
- Paul Bangay
- Elizabeth Banks (b. 1941)
- Julie Bargmann (b. 1958)
- Luis Barragán (1902‍–‍1988)
- Nathan Franklin Barrett (1845‍–‍1919)
- Jean-Pierre Barillet-Deschamps (1824‍–‍1873)
- Cheryl Barton
- Katherine Bashford (1885‍–‍1953)
- Nina Bassuk (b. 1952)
- Edward La Trobe Bateman (1816‍–‍1897)
- David Battersby
- Kirsten Bauer
- Sydney Baumgartner
- Bevis Bawa (1909‍–‍1992)
- Douglas Baylis (1915‍–‍1971)
- James Beard (1924‍–‍2017)
- François-Joseph Bélanger (1744‍–‍1818)
- Wilhelm Benque (1814‍–‍1895)
- Bill Bensley (b. 1959)
- Anita Berrizbeitia (b. 1957)
- Louis-Martin Berthault (1770‍–‍1823)
- Petra Blaisse (b. 1955)
- Jinny Blom (b. c. 1961)
- Edward Blore (1787‍–‍1879)
- Norfleet Giddings Bone (1892‍–‍1978)
- Decha Boonkham (b. 1939)
- Antoine de Bosc de la Calmette (1752‍–‍1803)
- Knut Adolf Bovin (1853‍–‍1926)
- Alice Bowe (b. 1980)
- Jacky Bowring
- Jacques Boyceau (c. 1560‍–‍1633)
- Ellen Braae (b. 1965)
- Gudmund Nyeland Brandt (1878‍–‍1945)
- Charles Bridgeman (1690‍–‍1738)
- Katherine Ruth Bridges (b. 1954)
- Loutrel Briggs (1893‍–‍1977)
- Mary Bristow (d. 1805)
- Jean Brodie-Hall (1925–2023)
- John Brookes (1933‍–‍2018)
- Capability Brown (c. 1716‍–‍1783)
- Jeffrey L. Bruce
- William Bruce (c. 1630‍–‍1710)
- Yves Brunier (1962‍–‍1991)
- Declan Buckley
- Catherin Bull
- Elizabeth Jane Bullard (1847-1916)
- Helen Bullard (1896‍–‍1987)
- Paolo Bürgi (b. 1947)
- Roberto Burle Marx (1909‍–‍1994)
- Decimus Burton (1800‍–‍1881)
- Pamela Burton (b. 1948)
- Jules Buyssens (1872‍–‍1958)
- Arthur Edwin Bye (1919‍–‍2001)

== C ==
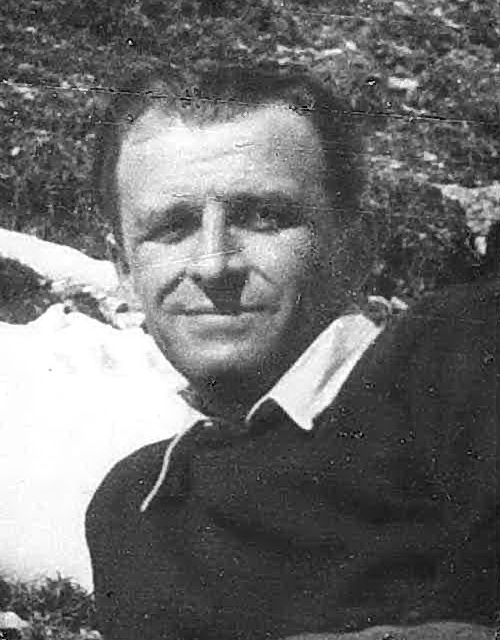
Polish architect Gerard Antoni Ciołek

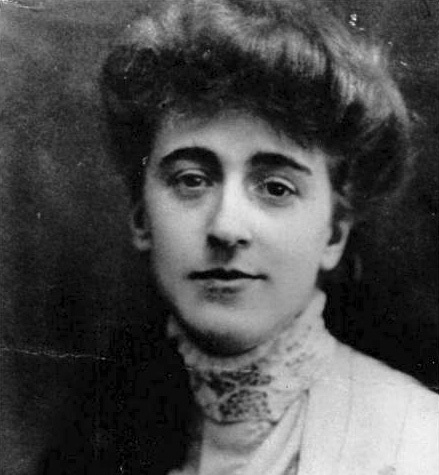
American architect Marian Cruger Coffin

- Alfred Caldwell (1903‍–‍1998)
- William B. Callaway (1943‍–‍2014)
- Percy Stephen Cane (1881‍–‍1976)
- Bradley Cantrell (b. 1975)
- Michele Canzio (1788‍–‍1868)
- Louis Carrogis Carmontelle (1717‍–‍1806)
- Jot D. Carpenter (1938‍–‍2000)
- Benito Javier Carrasco (1877‍–‍1958)
- Fernando Caruncho (b. 1957)
- Joachim Carvallo (1869‍–‍1936)
- Salomon de Caus (1576‍–‍1626)
- Marjorie Sewell Cautley (1891‍–‍1954)
- Alexandre Chemetoff (b. 1950)
- Stephen Child (1866‍–‍1936)
- Chon Unnamu (鄭雄男, b. 1951)
- Oi Choong
- Chamree Chulakaratna (b. 1955)
- Thomas Church (1902‍–‍1978)
- Gerard Antoni Ciołek (1909‍–‍1966)
- Ester Claesson (1884‍–‍1931)
- Gilmore David Clarke (1892‍–‍1982)
- Lewis J. Clarke (1927‍–‍2021)
- Grady Clay (1916‍–‍2013)
- Gilles Clément (b. 1943)
- Horace Cleveland (1814‍–‍1900)
- Brian Clouston (b. 1935)
- Randoll Coate (1909‍–‍2005)
- Andrea Cochran (b. 1954)
- Henry Sargent Codman (d. 1893)
- Ernest F. Coe (1866‍–‍1951)
- Marian Cruger Coffin (1876‍–‍1957)
- Lester Collins (1914‍–‍1993)
- Brenda Colvin (1897‍–‍1981)
- Wilbur David Cook (1869‍–‍1938)
- Robert Morris Copeland (1830‍–‍1874)
- Michel Corajoud (1937‍–‍2014)
- Claude Cormier (1960‍–‍2023)
- Ralph D. Cornell (1890‍–‍1972)
- James Corner (b. 1961)
- Lucile Council (1898‍–‍1964)
- David Cousin (1809‍–‍1878)
- Art Cowie (1934‍–‍2009)
- Laurie D. Cox (1883‍–‍1968)
- Ernst Cramer (1898‍–‍1980)
- Sylvia Crowe (1901‍–‍1997)
- Gordon Cullen (1914‍–‍1994)
- Kate Cullity
- John Y. Culyer (1839‍–‍1924)
- Frederick Alexander Cuthbert (1902‍–‍1978)

== D ==
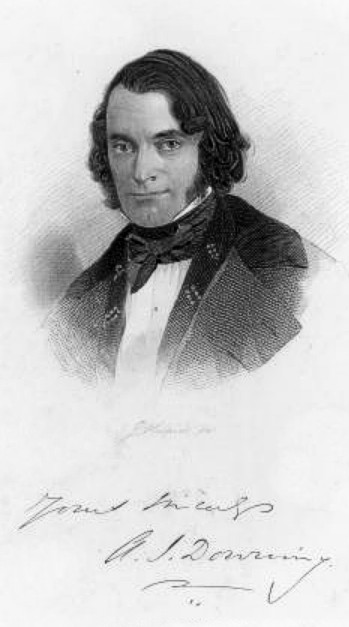
American architect Andrew Jackson Downing

- Christine Dalnoky (b. 1956)
- Angela Danadjieva (b. 1931)
- Mark Daniels (1881‍–‍1952)
- Date Sadamune (伊達定宗, 1902‍–‍1955)
- Émile David (1839‍–‍1873)
- James Frederick Dawson (1874‍–‍1941)
- Ruth Bramley Dean (1889‍–‍1932)
- Saco Rienk de Boer (1883‍–‍1974)
- Silvia Decorde
- Gustave Delchevalerie (1841‍–‍1899)
- Claude Desgots (c. 1658‍–‍1732)
- Pierre I Desgots (c. 1600‍–‍1675)
- Erik Dhont (b. 1962)
- Charles Edgar Dickinson (1908–1964)
- Julia Lester Dillon (1871‍–‍1959)
- Kaneji Domoto (1912‍–‍2002)
- Andrew Jackson Downing (1815‍–‍1852)
- Susannah Drake (b. 1965)
- Earle Sumner Draper (1893‍–‍1994)
- Herbert Dreiseitl (b. 1955)
- Achille Duchêne (1866‍–‍1947)
- William Perry Dudley (1891‍–‍1965)
- Lorrie Dunington-Grubb (1877‍–‍1945)

== E ==
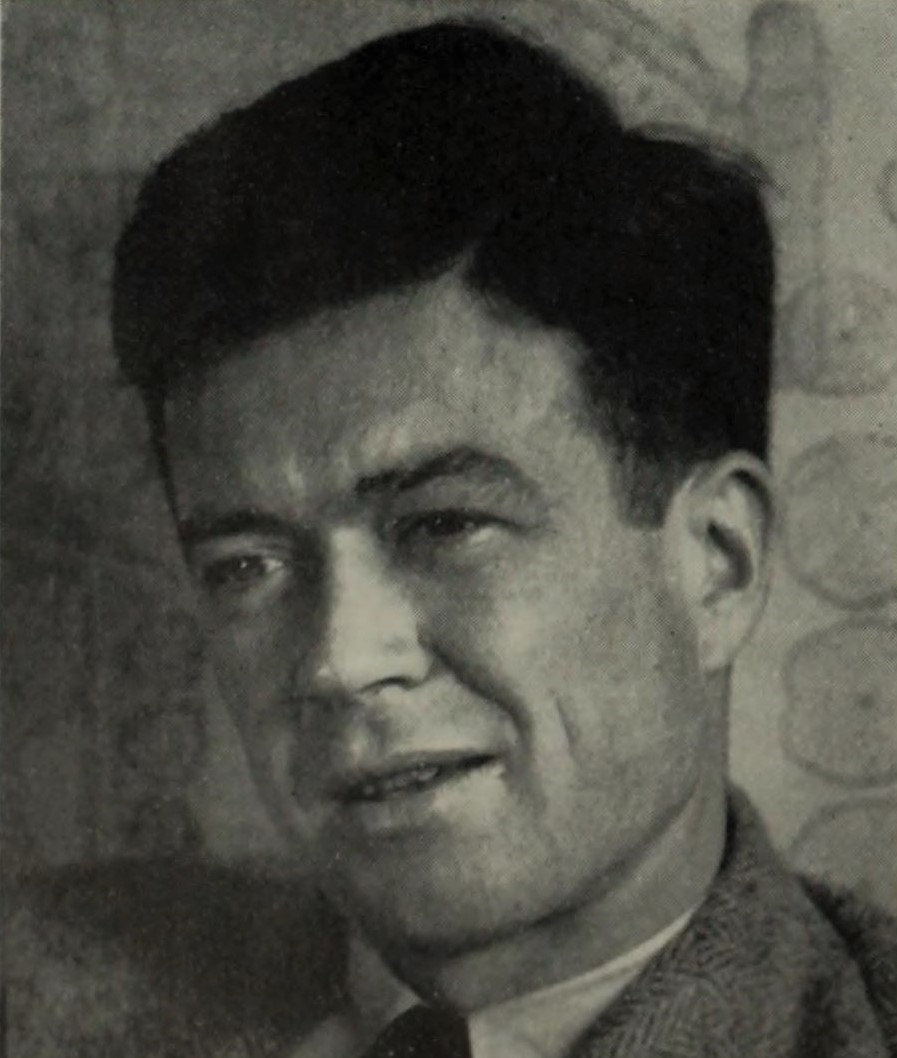
American architect Garrett Eckbo

- Charles Frederick Eaton (1842‍–‍1930)
- Garrett Eckbo (1910‍–‍2000)
- Edayoshi Shigetane (枝吉茂種)
- Alexander Edward (1651‍–‍1708)
- Charles Eliot (1859‍–‍1897)
- William Emes (1729/1730‍–‍1803)
- Walter von Engelhardt (1864‍–‍1940)
- Sunay Erdem (b. 1971)
- Dan Euser
- Ianto Evans (b. 1940)
- Morgan "Bill" Evans (1910‍–‍2002)
- Eyama Masami (江山正美, 1906‍–‍1978)

== F ==
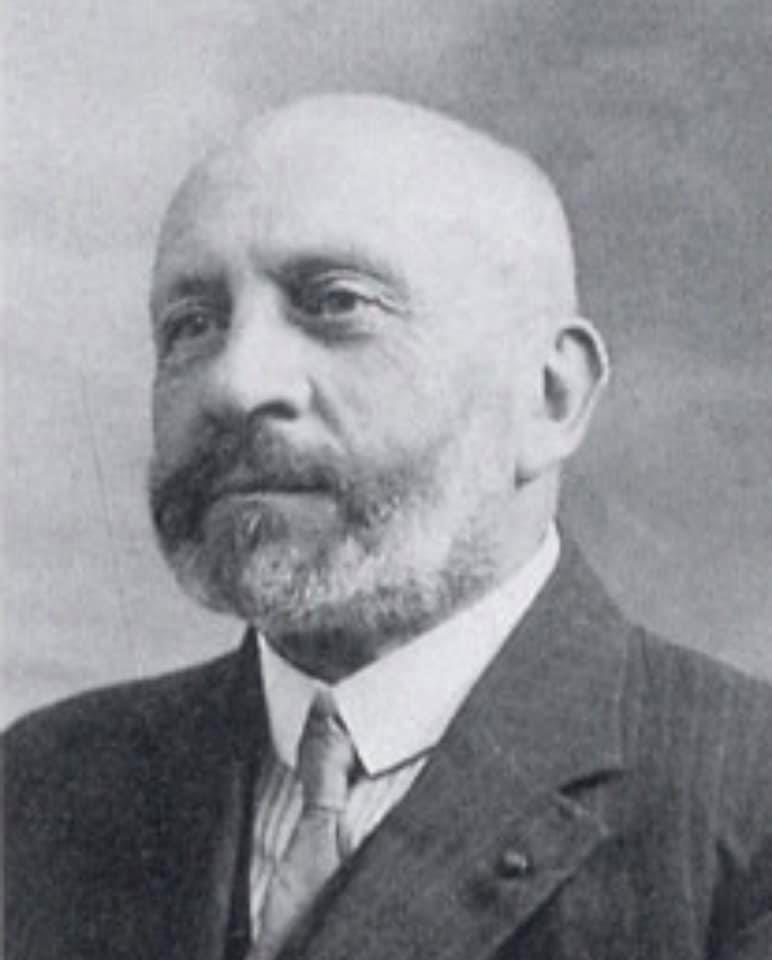
French architect Jean-Claude Nicolas Forestier

- Beatrix Farrand (1872‍–‍1959)
- Barbara Fealy (1903‍–‍2000)
- Bruce K. Ferguson (b. 1949)
- Ian Hamilton Finlay (1925‍–‍2006)
- Catherine FitzGerald (b. 1971)
- Annette Hoyt Flanders (1887‍–‍1946)
- Bryant Fleming (1877‍–‍1946)
- Henrik August Flindt (1822‍–‍1901)
- Gordon Ford (1918‍–‍1999)
- Jean-Claude Nicolas Forestier (1861‍–‍1930)
- Mulford B. Foster (1888‍–‍1978)
- Alessandro Francini (d. 1648)
- Tommaso Francini (1571‍–‍1651)
- M. Paul Friedberg (1931‍–‍2025)
- Fujisawa Ako (藤沢亜子, b. 1965)
- Fukuba Hayato (福羽逸人, 1856‍–‍1921)
- Fukuba Nobuzō (福羽発三, 1890‍–‍1962)
- Fukuba Onzō (福羽恩蔵, b. 1869)
- Fukukawa Seiichi (福川成一, b. 1947)

== G ==
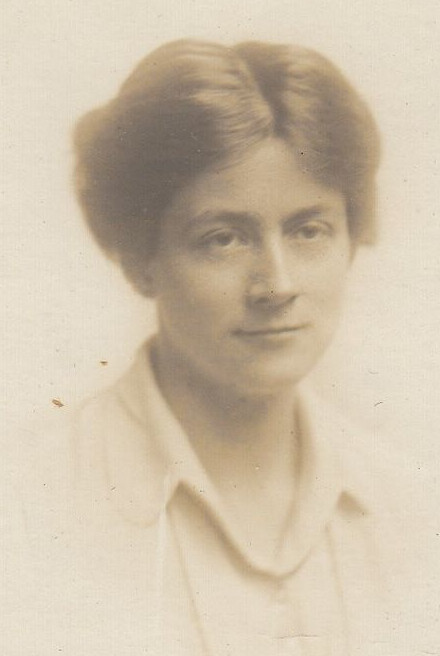
Scottish designer Norah Geddes

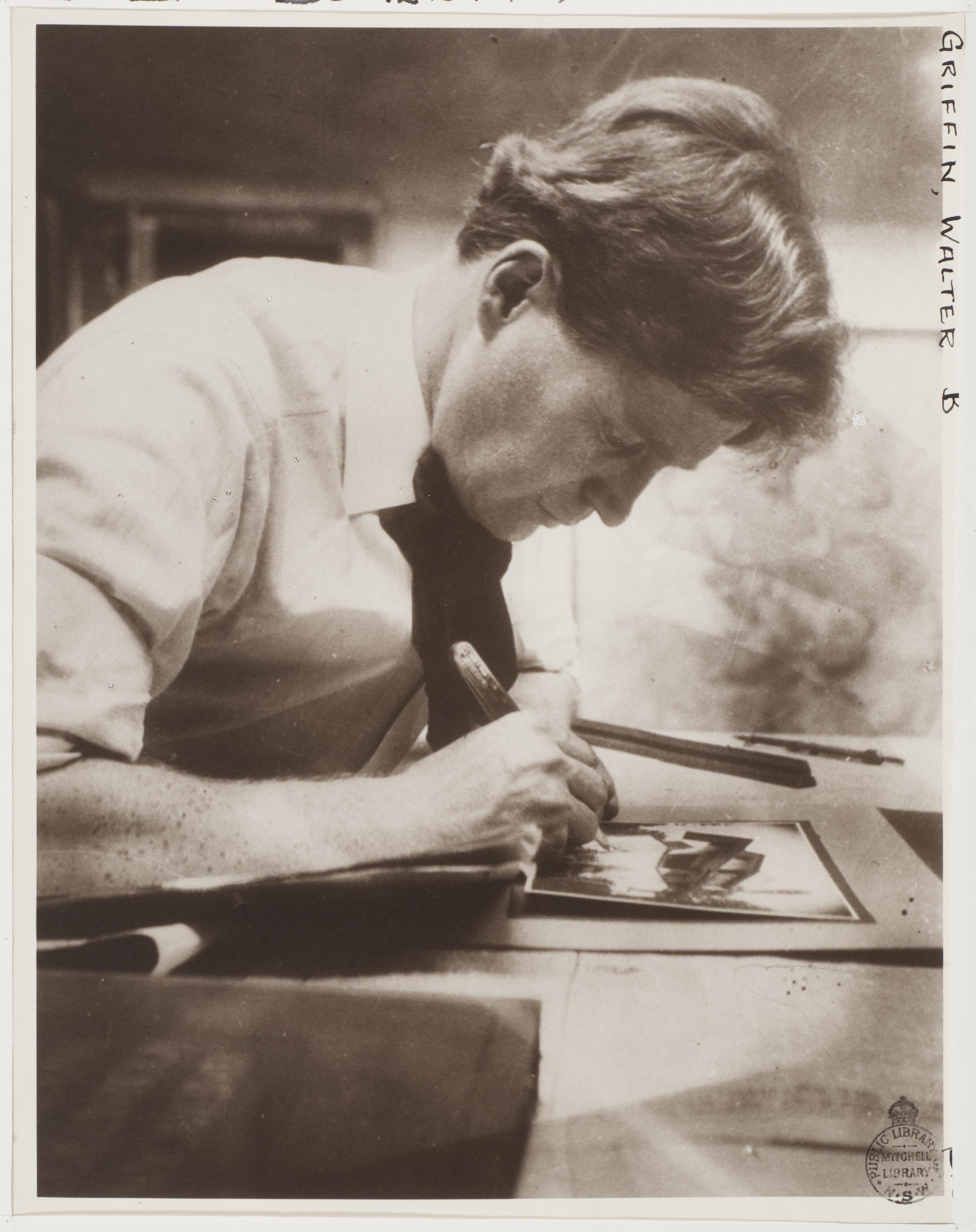
American architect Walter Burley Griffin

- Teresa Galí-Izard (b. 1968)
- Jacques Garcia (b. 1947)
- Nicolás García Uriburu (1937‍–‍2016)
- Norah Geddes (1887‍–‍1967)
- Adriaan Geuze (b. 1960)
- James Giles (1801‍–‍1870)
- Howard Gilkey (1890‍–‍1972)
- Charles Gillette (1886‍–‍1969)
- William Sawrey Gilpin (1762‍–‍1843)
- Dominique Girard (c. 1680‍–‍1738)
- René de Girardin (1735‍–‍1808)
- Auguste François Marie Glaziou (1828‍–‍1906)
- Kathryn Gleason
- Erik Glemme (1905‍–‍1959)
- David Glenn
- Walter Godfrey (1881–1961)
- William Goldring (1854‍–‍1919)
- Gotō Ken'ichi (後藤健一)
- Gotō Yoshimatsu (後藤由松, b. 1905)
- Jacques Gréber (1882‍–‍1962)
- Rose Greely (1887‍–‍1969)
- James Leal Greenleaf (1857‍–‍1933)
- Horatio Greenough (1805‍–‍1852)
- Daphna Greenstein (b. 1952)
- Walter Burley Griffin (1876‍–‍1937)
- Juan Grimm (b. 1952)
- John St. Bodfan Gruffydd (1910‍–‍2004)
- Thomas Guerra (b. 1985)
- William Guilfoyle (1840‍–‍1912)
- Kathryn Gustafson (b. 1951)
- Gyokuenbō (玉淵坊)

== H ==
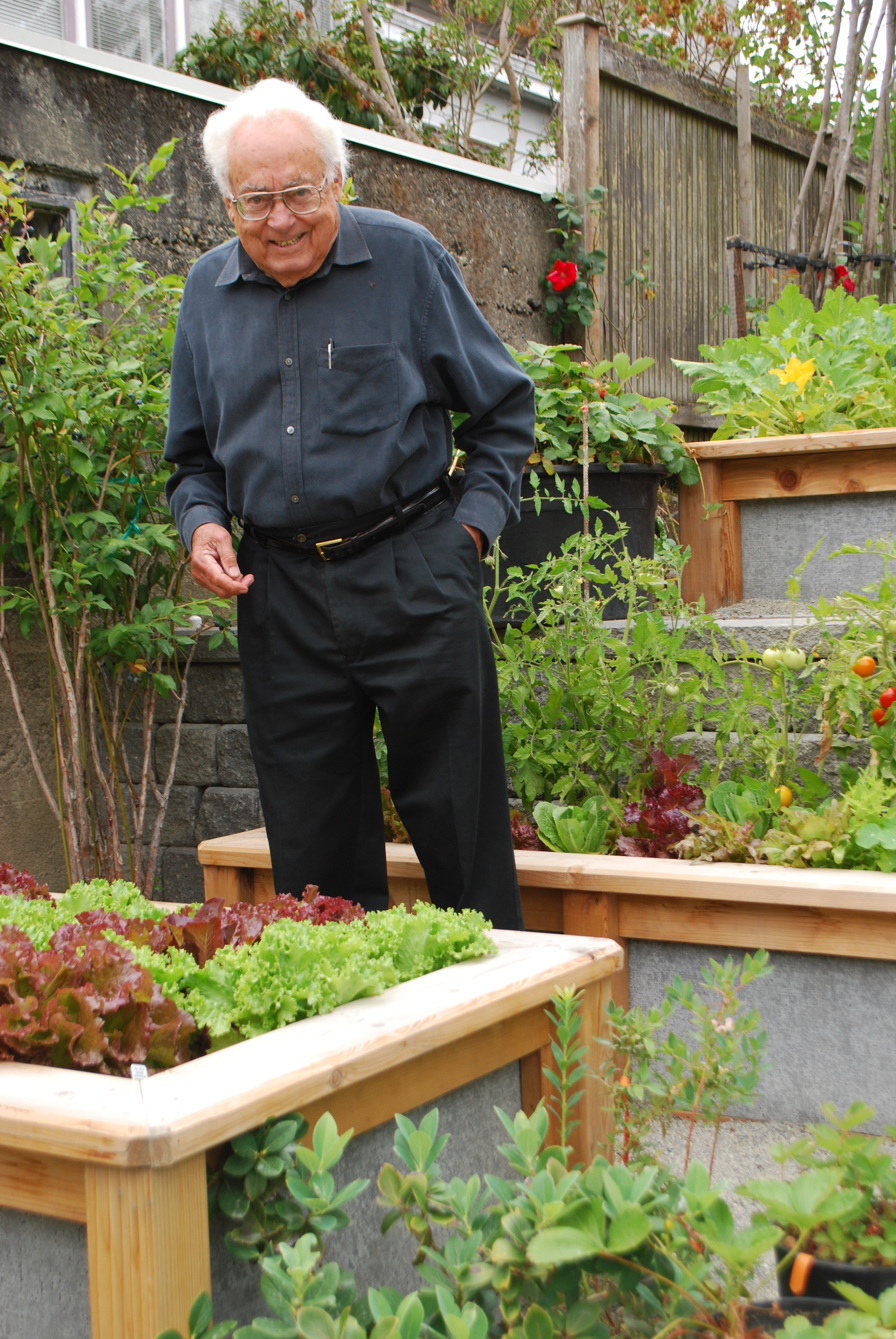
American architect Richard Haag

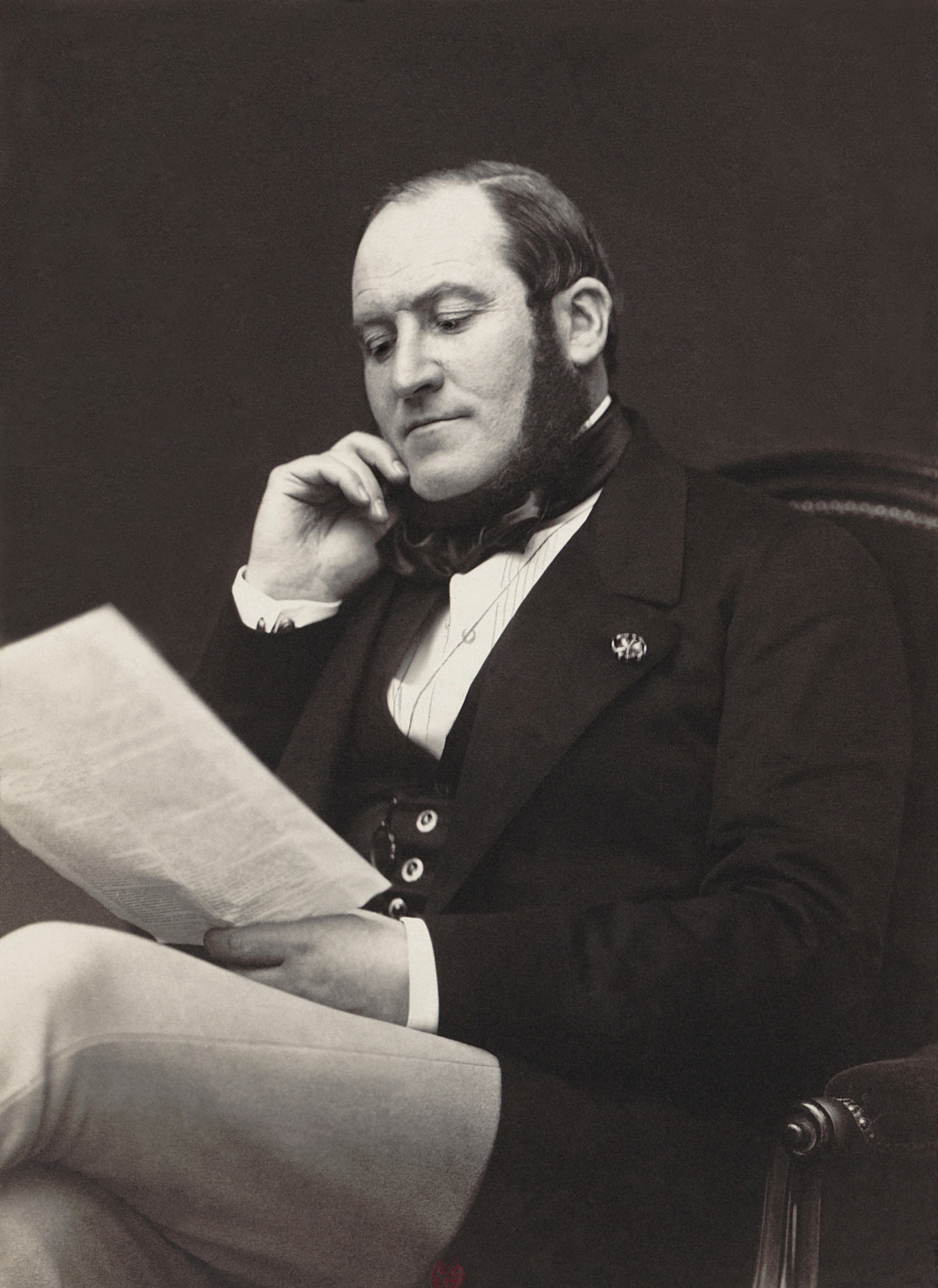
French urban planner Georges-Eugène Haussmann

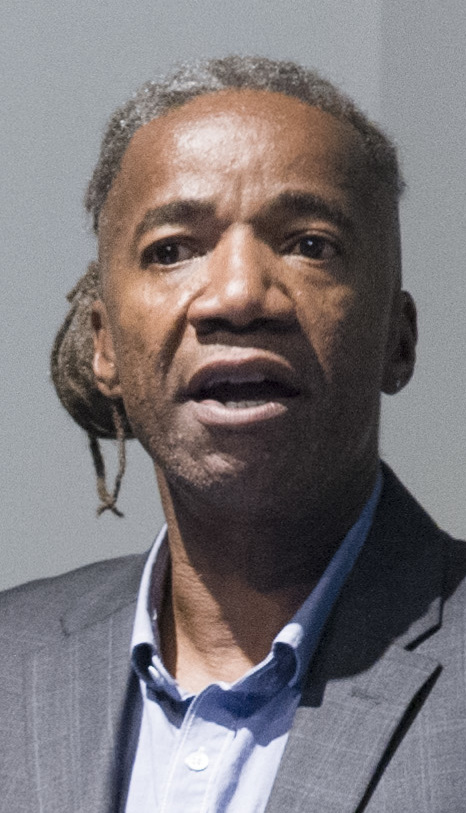
American architect Walter J. Hood

- Richard Haag (1923‍–‍2018)
- Makoto Hagiwara (1854‍–‍1925)
- Lawrence Halprin (1916‍–‍2009)
- Herta Hammerbacher (1900‍–‍1985)
- John Hancock (1808‍–‍1890)
- Ralph Hancock (1893‍–‍1950)
- Handa Mariko (半田真理子, 1947‍–‍2014)
- A. E. Hanson (1893‍–‍1986)
- Hanyu Masaaki (埴生雅章, b. 1948)
- Harada Eishin (原田榮進, b. 1933)
- Hara Hiroshi (原煕, 1868‍–‍1934)
- S. Herbert Hare (1888‍–‍1960)
- Sid J. Hare (1860‍–‍1938)
- Gil Har-Gil (b. 1953)
- George Hargreaves (b. 1952)
- Hasegawa Hiroki (長谷川浩己, b. 1958)
- Hironao Hasegawa (長谷川弘直, b .1945)
- Hashimoto Yaezō (橋本八重三, b. 1895)
- Hattori Akiyo (服部明世, 1940‍–‍2014)
- Georges-Eugène Haussmann (1809‍–‍1891)
- Kiyohide Hayakawa (1949‍–‍2018)
- Hayashi Jirō (林次郎, b. 1927)
- Hayashi Nozomi (林脩己, 1874‍–‍1945)
- Anouska Hempel (b. 1941)
- Edith Henderson (1911‍–‍2005)
- William Henderson (1802‍–‍1885)
- Margaret Hendry (1930‍–‍2001)
- Ghislain-Joseph Henry (1754‍–‍1820)
- Randolph T. Hester (b. 1944)
- Ivan Hicks
- Higashi Bairi (東梅里, 1898‍–‍1996)
- Ina Higgins (1860‍–‍1948)
- Oliver Hill (1887‍–‍1968)
- Hiramatsu Kiyofusa (平松清房, b. 1947)
- Hirano Kanzō (平野侃三, b. 1931)
- Hiraoka Kōki (平岡宏歸, b. 1933)
- Hiraoka Naoki (平岡直樹, b. 1960)
- Hirashima Takashi (平嶋孝, b. 1953)
- Hirata Masahiro (平田匡宏)
- Hirayama Katsuzō (平山勝蔵, 1899‍–‍1990)
- Christian Cay Lorenz Hirschfeld (1742‍–‍1792)
- Hiruta Kanji (蛭田貫二)
- Hisatsune Shūhji (久恒秀治, 1911‍–‍1982)
- Hiwatashi Tatsuya (樋渡達也, b. 1931)
- Desmond Ho (b. 1961)
- Henry Hoare (1705‍–‍1785)
- Tom Hoblyn
- Clement Hodgkinson (1818‍–‍1893)
- Robert Holden (b. 1947)
- Edmund Hollander (b. 1954)
- Hashimoto Ken (ja:橋本健 (造園家))
- Honda Kinkichirō (本多錦吉郎, 1851‍–‍1921)
- Honda Seiroku (本多静六, 1866‍–‍1952)
- Hongō Takanori (本郷高徳, 1877‍–‍1945)
- Walter J. Hood (b. 1958)
- Hoshi Susumu (星進, b. 1910)
- Hosoya Tsuneo (細谷恒夫, b. 1944)
- Hosooka Akira (ja:細岡晃)
- Harry Howard (1930‍–‍2000)
- Hubert Howard (1907‍–‍1987)
- Heather Howat
- Henry Vincent Hubbard (1875‍–‍1947)
- Theodora Kimball Hubbard (1887‍–‍1935)
- Daniel Ray Hull (1890‍–‍1964)
- Maximilien Joseph Hurtault (1765‍–‍1824)
- Martha Brookes Hutcheson (1871‍–‍1959)

== I ==
- Ichikawa Masashi (市川政司, 1888‍–‍1961)
- Ichikawa Yukio (市川之雄, 1866‍–‍1937)
- Igarashi Masao (五十嵐政郎, b. 1957)
- Iguchi Yoshiya (井口義也, b. 1955)
- Iida Jūki (飯田十基, 1890‍–‍1977)
- Iijima Ryō (飯島亮, 1908‍–‍1990)
- Ikebara Ken'ichirō (池原謙一郎, 1928‍–‍2002)
- Ikebe Taketo (池辺武人, 1901‍–‍1993)
- Imagawa Masahiko (今川正彦, 1911‍–‍1996)
- Yoshitomo Imanishi (今西良共, b. 1957)
- Imoto Masanobu (井本政信, 1891‍–‍1957)
- Inada Jun'ichi (稲田純一, b. 1952)
- Inomata Yasuo (猪又康夫)
- Inoshita Kiyoshi (井下清, 1884‍–‍1973)
- Inouye Tadayoshi (井上忠佳, b. 1944)
- Inouye Takahiro (井上剛宏, b. 1946)
- Inouye Takushi (井上卓之, 1921‍–‍1995)
- Inouye Yoshiharu (井上芳治, 1941‍–‍2016)
- Alice Recknagel Ireys (1911‍–‍2000)
- Ishigami Kashirō (石神甲子郎, 1900‍–‍1979)
- Ishigami Yoshio (石神義雄, b. 1895)
- Kazuyuki Ishihara (b. 1958)
- Ishihara Ken'ichirō (石原憲一郎, b. 1947)
- Ishihara Shūji (石原周次, b. 1935)
- Ishikawa Hajime (石川初, b. 1964)
- Ishikawa Mikiko (石川幹子, b. 1948)
- Ishimi Shigeo (石見茂夫, b. 1949)
- Ishiuchi Nobuyuki (石内展行, b. 1920)
- Itagaki Shūetsu (板垣修悦, b. 1942)
- Itō Hidemasa (伊藤英昌, b. 1943)
- Itō Kiyomi (伊藤精美, b. 1948)
- Itō Kunie (伊藤邦衛, 1924‍–‍2016)
- Itotani Masatoshi (糸谷正俊)
- Iwaki Sentarō (岩城亘太郎, 1898‍–‍1988)

== J ==
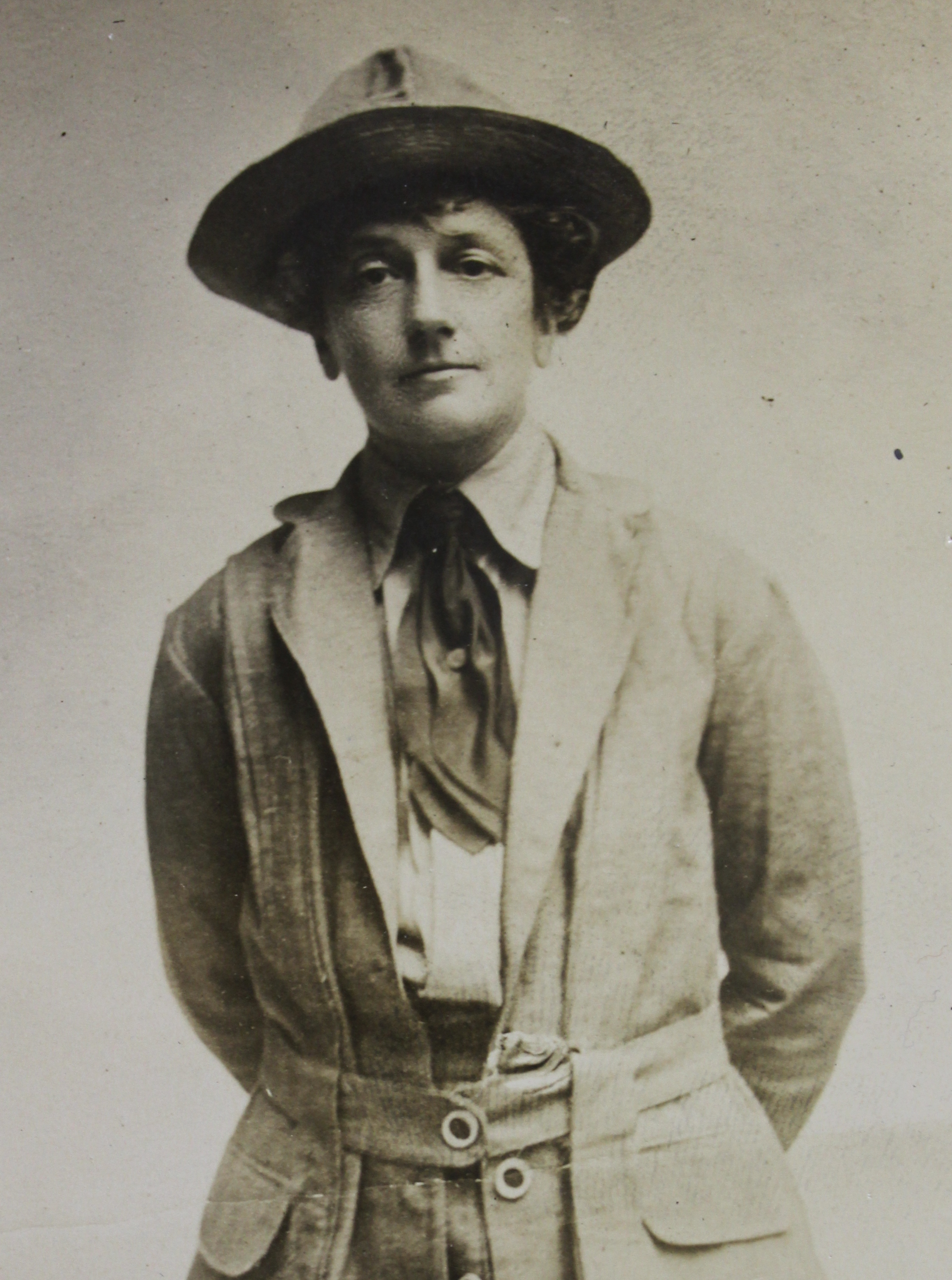
American architect Mary Rutherfurd Jay

- J. B. Jackson (1909‍–‍1996)
- Peter Jacobs (b. 1939)
- Kelly James (1958‍–‍2006)
- Jules Janlet (1880‍–‍1973)
- Mary Rutherfurd Jay (1872‍–‍1953)
- Gertrude Jekyll (1843‍–‍1932))
- Geoffrey Jellicoe (1900‍–‍1996)
- Brian Jencek
- Charles Jencks (1939‍–‍2019)
- Jens Jensen (1860‍–‍1951)
- Kristine Jensen (b. 1956)
- Ji Cheng (計成, 1582‍–‍c. 1642)
- Carol R. Johnson (1929‍–‍2020)
- Robert Jolicoeur (b. 1948)
- Grant Jones (1938‍–‍2021)
- Kathleen Lloyd Jones (1898‍–‍1978)
- Joseph Forsyth Johnson (1840‍–‍1906)
- Raymond Jungles
- Naohiko Jūrakuji (十楽寺直彦, b. 1926)

== K ==
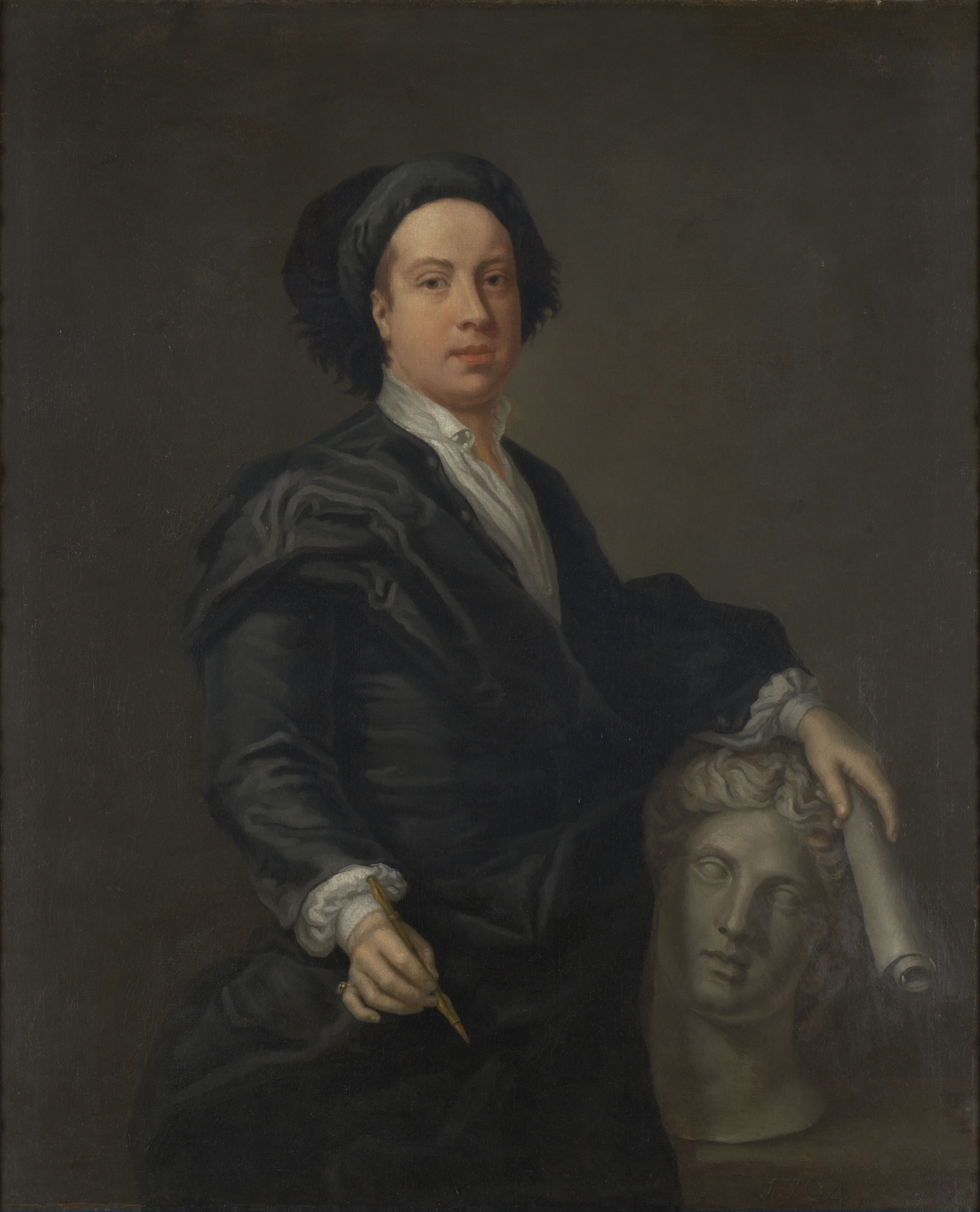
English architect William Kent

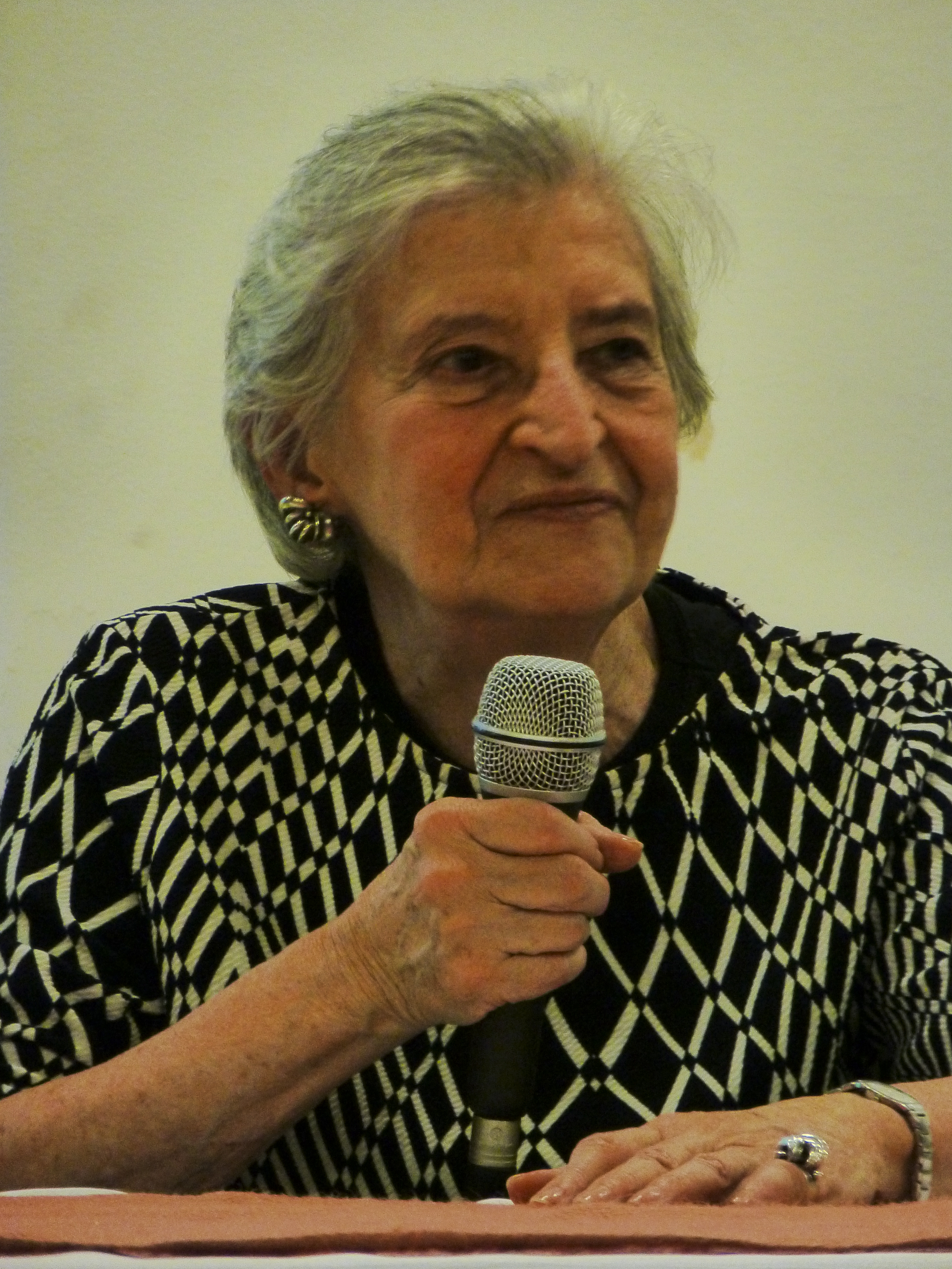
Brazilian architect Rosa Grena Kliass

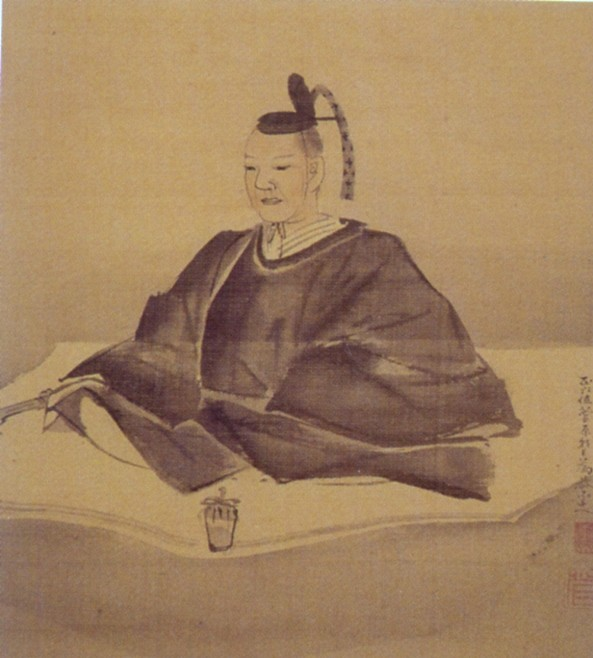
Japanese aristocrat and garden designer Kobori Enshū

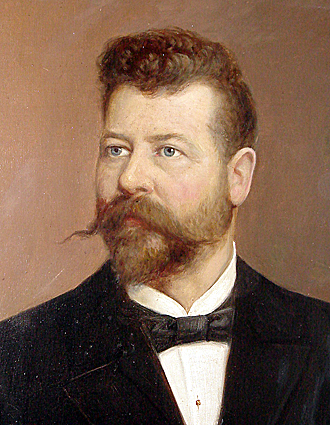
German architect Georg Kuphaldt

- Kageyama Yoshiaki (鍵山喜昭, b. 1935)
- Katayama Hiroaki (片山博昭, b. 1960)
- Kajinishi Sadao (楫西貞雄)
- Hirokazu Kaku (賀耒宏和, b. 1954)
- Kamata Matsutarō (鎌田松太郎, b. 1868)
- Kameyama Hajime (亀山始, b. 1948)
- Kaminaga Takashi (神長敬, b. 1966)
- Kanai Toshihiko (金井利彦, b. 1914)
- Kanetsuna Shigeharu (金綱重治, b. 1947)
- Kaneko Tadakatsu (ja:金子忠一)
- Kano Tsutomu (狩野力, 1892‍–‍1934)
- Çiğdem Karaaslan (b. 1979)
- Katō Seihei (加藤誠平, 1906‍–‍1969)
- Katō Gorō (加藤五郎, 1906‍–‍?)
- Katō Yasutarō (加藤雍太郎)
- Katsumoto Donketsu (勝元鈍穴, 1810‍–‍1889)
- Kawai Tsuguo (河合嗣生, b. 1959)
- Kawamoto Akio (川本昭雄, 1927‍–‍2004)
- Koichi Kawana (1930‍–‍1990)
- Kawana Shunji (川名俊次)
- Kawase Atsumi (川瀬篤美, b. 1937)
- Tamotsu Kawashima (川島保)
- Hans Kayser (1884‍–‍1964)
- Marc P. Keane (b. 1958)
- Jennifer Keesmaat (b. 1970)
- Édouard Keilig (1827‍–‍1895)
- Bruce Kelly (1948‍–‍1993)
- Edward Kemp (1817‍–‍1891)
- William Kent (c. 1685‍–‍1748)
- George Edward Kessler (1862‍–‍1923)
- Kido Masamitsu (木戸雅光)
- Dieter Kienast (1945‍–‍1998)
- Karen Kiest
- Kikutake Kuraji (菊竹倉二, 1914‍–‍1957)
- Dan Kiley (1912‍–‍2004)
- Mikyoung Kim (b. 1968)
- Kimura Hideo (木村英夫, 1909‍–‍2001)
- Kimura Saburō (木村三郎, 1907‍–‍1996)
- Masao Kinoshita (1925‍–‍2003)
- Kinoshita Takeshi (木下剛, b. 1967)
- Andreas Kipar (b. 1960)
- Kitagawa Akisuke (北川明介)
- Kitamura Nobumasa (北村信正, 1914‍–‍2010)
- Kitamura Tokutarō (北村徳太郎, 1895‍–‍1964)
- Kita Shigeto (北重人, 1948‍–‍2009)
- Kitayama Takeyuki (北山武征, b. 1944)
- Cherie Kluesing (d. 1989)
- Rosa Grena Kliass (b. 1932)
- Alistair Knox (1912‍–‍1986)
- Kobayashi Haruto (小林治人, b. 1937)
- Kobayashi Yasushige (小林安茂, b. 1927)
- Kobayashi Akira (小林昭)
- Kobori Enshū (1579‍–‍1647)
- Kodaira Yoshichika (小平義近, 1845‍–‍1912)
- Kodera Shunkichi (小寺駿吉, 1901‍–‍1975)
- Kojima Saichi (小島佐一, 1906‍–‍1978)
- Kondō Kimio (近藤公夫, 1929‍–‍2016)
- Leonard Koren (b. 1948)
- Kosaka Tatsuo (小坂立夫, 1903‍–‍1996)
- Johan Cornelius Krieger (1683‍–‍1755)
- Simone Kroll (b. 1928)
- Juta Krulc (1913‍–‍2015)
- Gustav Hermann Krumbiegel (1865‍–‍1956)
- Kubo Tadashi (久保貞, 1922‍–‍1990)
- Gertrude Kuh (1893‍–‍1977)
- Georg Kuphaldt (1853‍–‍1938)
- Hoichi Kurisu
- Yosh Kuromiya (1923‍–‍2018)

== L ==
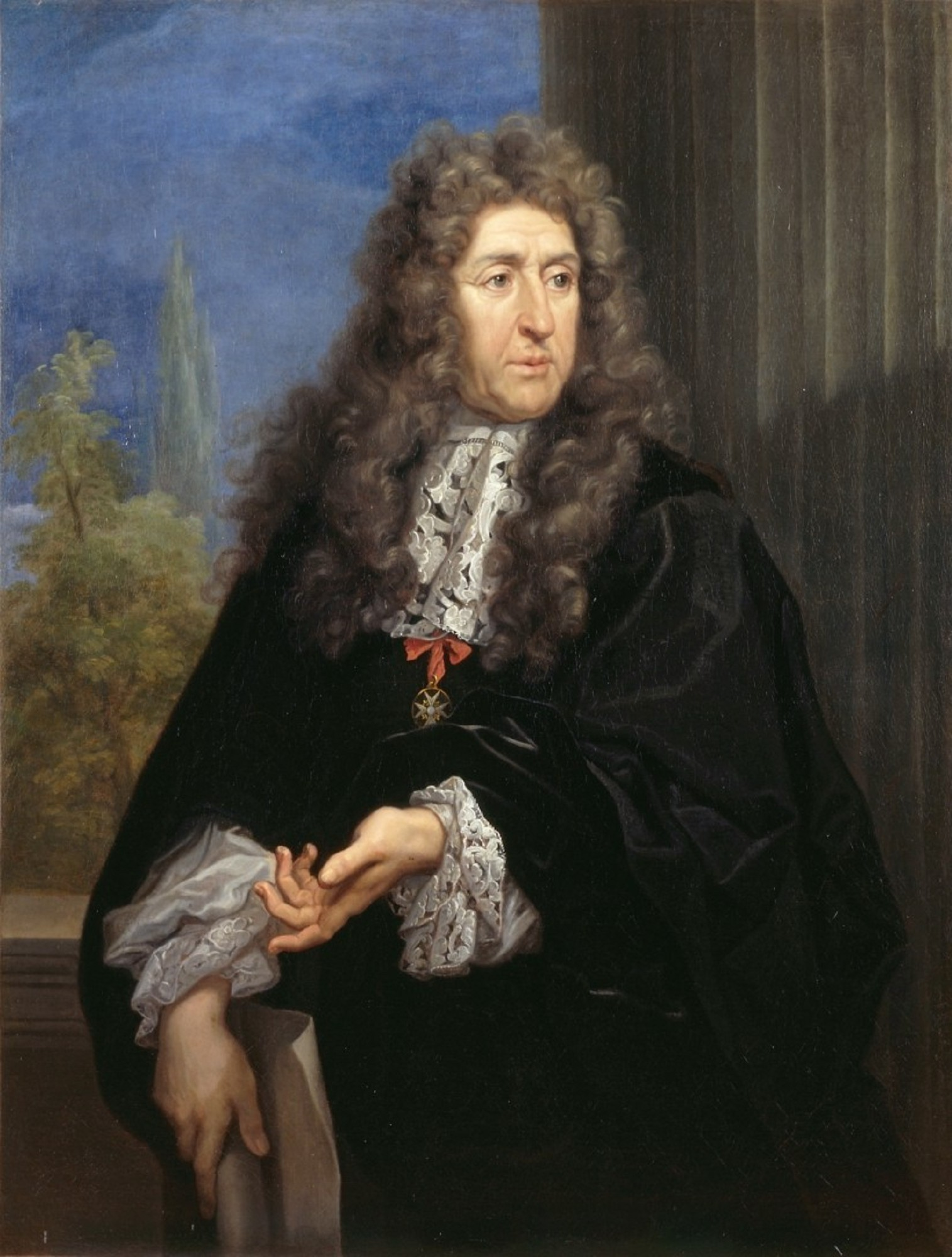
French architect André Le Nôtre

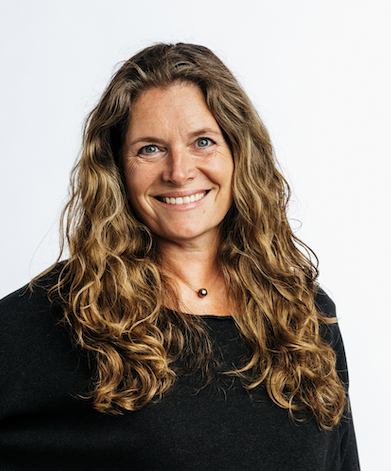
Canadian architect Nina-Marie Lister

- Elie Lainé (1829‍–‍1911)
- Nancy Lancaster (1897‍–‍1994)
- Samuel C. Lancaster (1864‍–‍1941)
- Batty Langley (1696‍–‍1751)
- Peter Latz (b. 1939)
- Max Laeuger (1864‍–‍1952)
- Ernest Law (1854‍–‍1930)
- Elizabeth Lawrence (1904‍–‍1985)
- Charles Downing Lay (1877‍–‍1956)
- Charles Wellford Leavitt (1871‍–‍1928)
- Jean-Baptiste Alexandre Le Blond (1679‍–‍1719)
- Clermont Huger Lee (1914‍–‍2006)
- Ferdinand Leffler (b. 1978)
- W. Dorr Legg (1904‍–‍1994)
- Mia Lehrer (b. 1953)
- Pierre Charles L'Enfant (1754‍–‍1825)
- Peter Joseph Lenné (1789‍–‍1866)
- Arabella Lennox-Boyd (b. 1938)
- André Le Nôtre (1613‍–‍1700)
- Marianne Levinsen (b. 1963)
- Philip H. Lewis Jr. (1925‍–‍2017)
- Ricardo Librero
- Reinhold Lingner (1902‍–‍1968)
- Karl Linn (1923‍–‍2005)
- Forbes Lipschitz
- Nina-Marie Lister (b. 1966)
- Tatjana Ljujić-Mijatović (b. 1941)
- Roddy Llewellyn (b. 1947)
- George Loddiges (1784/1786‍–‍1846)
- George London (c. 1640‍–‍1714)
- Elizabeth Blodget Lord (1887‍–‍1974)
- Kamel Louafi (b. 1952)
- John Claudius Loudon (1783‍–‍1843)
- Guy Lowell (1870‍–‍1927)
- Charles N. Lowrie (1869‍–‍1939)
- Di Lucas (b. 1950)
- André Lurçat (1894‍–‍1970)

== M ==
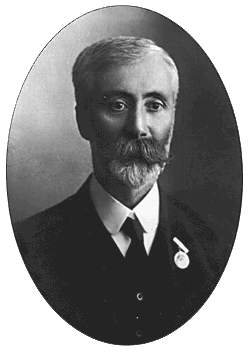
Australian botanist Joseph Maiden

American landscape designer Warren H. Manning

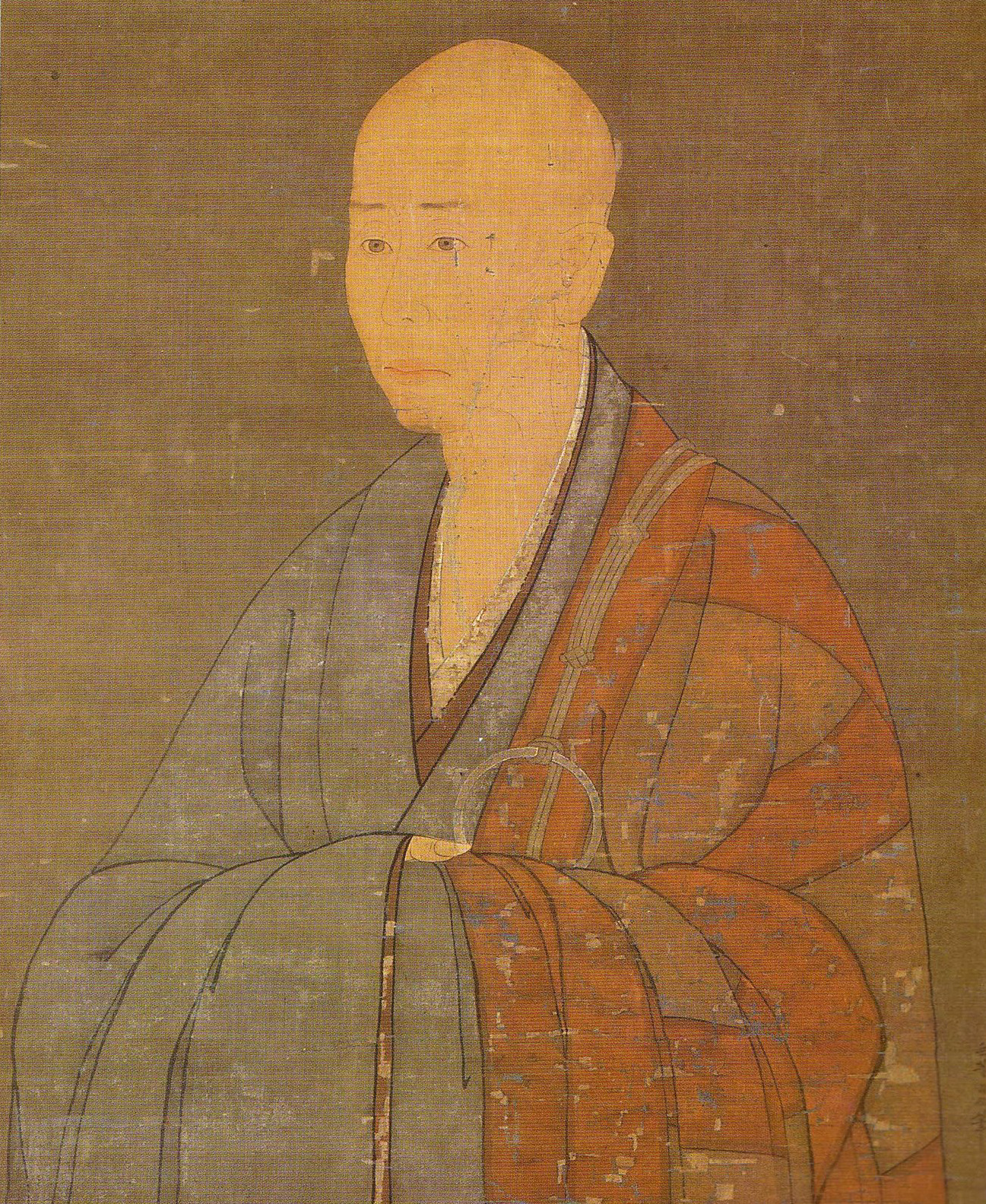
Buddhist monk and garden designer Musō Soseki

- Winy Maas (b. 1959)
- Alexander MacWilliam Sr. (1891‍–‍1966)
- Maeda Minosuke (前田巳之助, 1889‍–‍1966)
- Maeno Jun'ichirō (前野淳一郎, b. 1926)
- Maezawa Yōichi (ja:前澤洋一)
- Kamel Mahadin (b. 1954)
- Joseph Maiden (1859‍–‍1925)
- Charles Edward Mallows (1864‍–‍1915)
- Giuseppe Manetti (1761‍–‍1817)
- Warren H. Manning (1860‍–‍1938)
- Johan Ludvig Mansa (1740‍–‍1820)
- Clare Cooper Marcus (b. 1934)
- Eugene Martini (1915‍–‍1965)
- Mase Nobuyuki (間瀬延幸, 1936‍–‍1991)
- Masuda Noboru (増田昇, b. 1952)
- Shunmyō Masuno (b. 1953)
- Evan Mather (b. 1970)
- Anuradha Mathur (1960‍–‍2022)
- Matsuzaki Takashi (松崎喬, b. 1941)
- Kazuya Matsudaira (松平和也, b .1973)
- Masafumi Matsumae (松前和史, b .1960)
- Edward Prentice Mawson (1885‍–‍1954)
- Thomas Hayton Mawson (1861‍–‍1933)
- Ian McHarg (1920‍–‍2001)
- Laurel McSherry
- Rachel Lambert Mellon (1910‍–‍2014)
- Adam Menelaws (d. 1831)
- Pacello da Mercogliano (c. 1455‍–‍1534)
- John Merryweather (1932‍–‍2019)
- Evariste Mertens (1846‍–‍1907)
- Elizabeth K. Meyer
- Johann Heinrich Gustav Meyer (1816‍–‍1877)
- Leberecht Migge (1881‍–‍1935)
- Lynden Miller (b. 1938)
- Edward Milner (1819‍–‍1884)
- Henry Ernest Milner (1845‍–‍1906)
- Minami Yoshihide (南吉英, b. 1949)
- Minomo Toshitarō (蓑茂寿太郎, b. 1950)
- Minomushisanjin (蓑虫山人, 1836‍–‍1900)
- Misawa Akira (三沢彰, 1942‍–‍1994)
- Mita Ikuo (三田育雄, b. 1939)
- Mitani Tōru (三谷徹, b. 1960)
- Mitani Yasuhiko (三谷康彦, b. 1947)
- Mary Mitchell (1923‍–‍1988)
- Mitsuhashi Kazuya (三橋一也, 1925‍–‍2010)
- Mitsuzono Takeo (滿園武雄, b. 1944)
- Miyagi Shunsaku (宮城俊作, b. 1957)
- Miyake Nobuya (三宅宣哉, b. 1938)
- Shōsuke Miyake (三宅祥介, b. 1947)
- Tōru Miyakoda (都田徹, b. 1941)
- Leland Miyano
- Gorō Miyazaki (b. 1967)
- Mizutani Shun'ichi (水谷駿一, 1894‍–‍1970)
- Elizabeth Bauer Mock (1911‍–‍1998)
- Hal Moggridge (b. 1936)
- André Mollet (1600‍–‍1665)
- Claude Mollet (c. 1564‍–‍c. 1649)
- Jean-Marie Morel (1728‍–‍1810)
- Mori Kannosuke (森歓之助, 1894‍–‍1960)
- Mori Kazuo (森一雄, 1890‍–‍1968)
- Mori Osamu (森蘊, 1905‍–‍1988)
- Carlo Morici (b. 1974)
- Moriwaki Tatsuo (森脇竜雄, 1904‍–‍1973)
- Moriyama Masayuki (森山雅幸, b. 1949)
- Mary Horgan Mowbray-Clarke (1874‍–‍1962)
- Murasame Tatsumasa, a.k.a. Jakob Sebastian Björk (村雨辰剛, b. 1988)
- Robert Murase (1938‍–‍2005)
- Musō Soseki (1275‍–‍1351)

== N ==
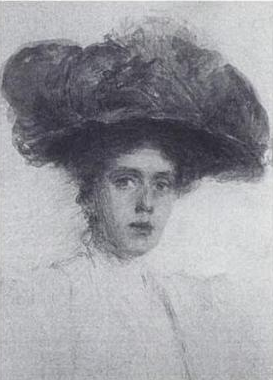
American architect Rose Standish Nichols

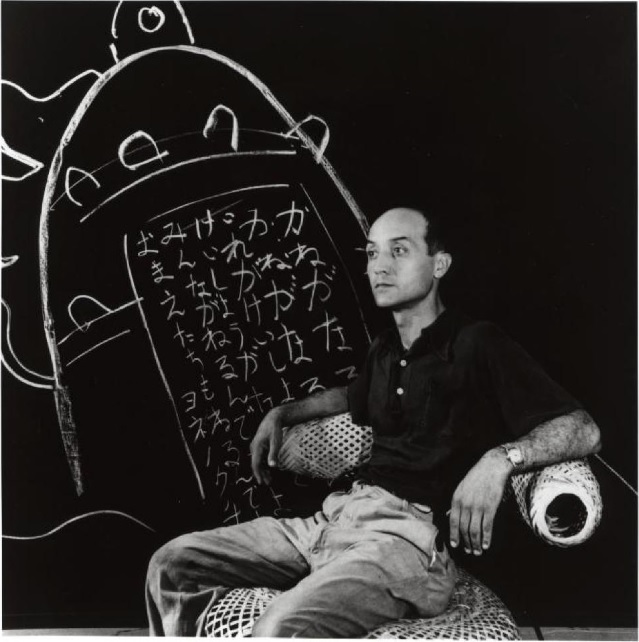
American architect Isamu Noguchi

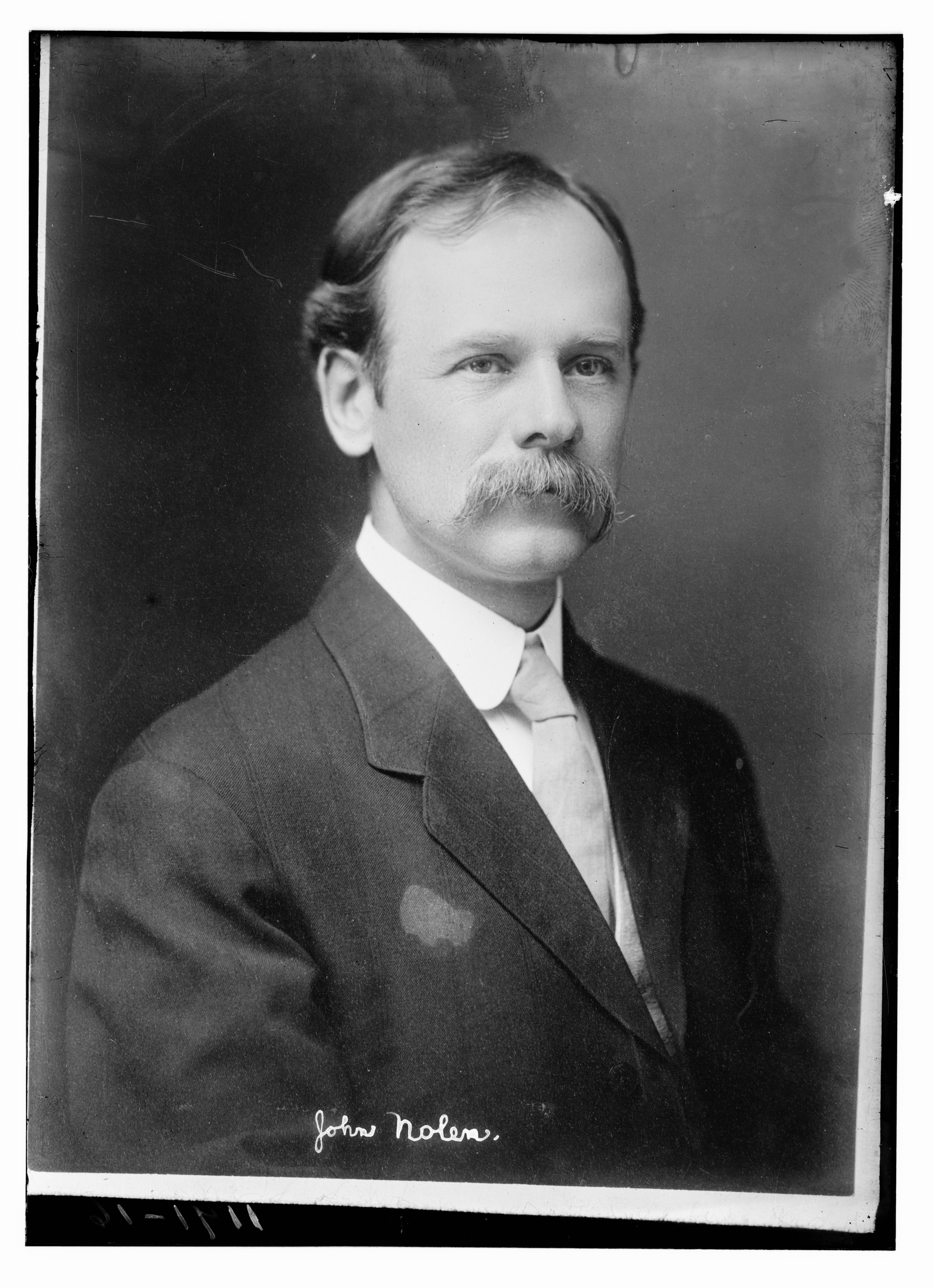
American architect John Nolen

- Nagamatsu Tarō (長松太郎, 1912‍–‍1978)
- Nagami Ken'ichi (永見健一, 1892‍–‍1952)
- Nagaoka Yasuhei (長岡安平, 1842‍–‍1925)
- Nagasaki Tsuyoshi (長崎剛志, b. 1970)
- Naitō Eishirō (内藤英四郎, b. 1948)
- Naitō Tsunekata (内藤恒方, 1934‍–‍2020)
- Nakajima Hiroshi (中島宏, b. 1938)
- Ken Nakajima (1914‍–‍2000)
- Nakajima Usaburō (中島卯三郎, 1888‍–‍1971)
- Nakami Tetsu (中見哲, b. 1947)
- Hitoshi Nakamura (b. 1944)
- Nakamura Yoshio (中村良夫, b. 1938)
- Nakamura Keigo (中村圭吾)
- Nakane Kinsaku (中根金作, 1917‍–‍1995)
- Nakane Shirō (中根史郎, b. 1950)
- Nakatsu Hideyuki (中津秀之, b. 1962)
- Nakase Isao (中瀬勲, b. 1948)
- Nakazawa Kazuo (中澤一夫, b. 1919)
- Ushinosuke Narahara (奈良原牛之助, b. 1888)
- Christian Heinrich Nebbien (1778‍–‍1841)
- William Andrews Nesfield (1793‍–‍1881)
- Justin Newcombe
- Norman Newton (1898‍–‍1992)
- Vasily Neyolov (1722‍–‍1782)
- Shannon Nichol
- Arthur R. Nichols (1881‍–‍1970)
- Robert Nichols (1919‍–‍2010)
- Rose Standish Nichols (1872‍–‍1960)
- Signe Nielsen
- Satoru Nishita (1927‍–‍2013)
- Nitta Shinzō (新田伸三, 1920‍–‍1997)
- Nishikawa Yoshiteru (ja:西川嘉輝)
- Noborisaka Makoto (登坂誠, b. 1960)
- Isamu Noguchi (1904‍–‍1988)
- John Nolen (1869‍–‍1937)
- Noma Yasuto (野間守人, 1889‍–‍1945)
- Nomura Kanji (野村勘治, b. 1950)
- Nozawa Kiyoshi (野沢清, 1932‍–‍2006)
- Frederick Nussbaumer (1850‍–‍1906)

== O ==
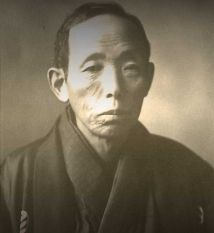
Japanese garden designer Ogawa Jihei VII

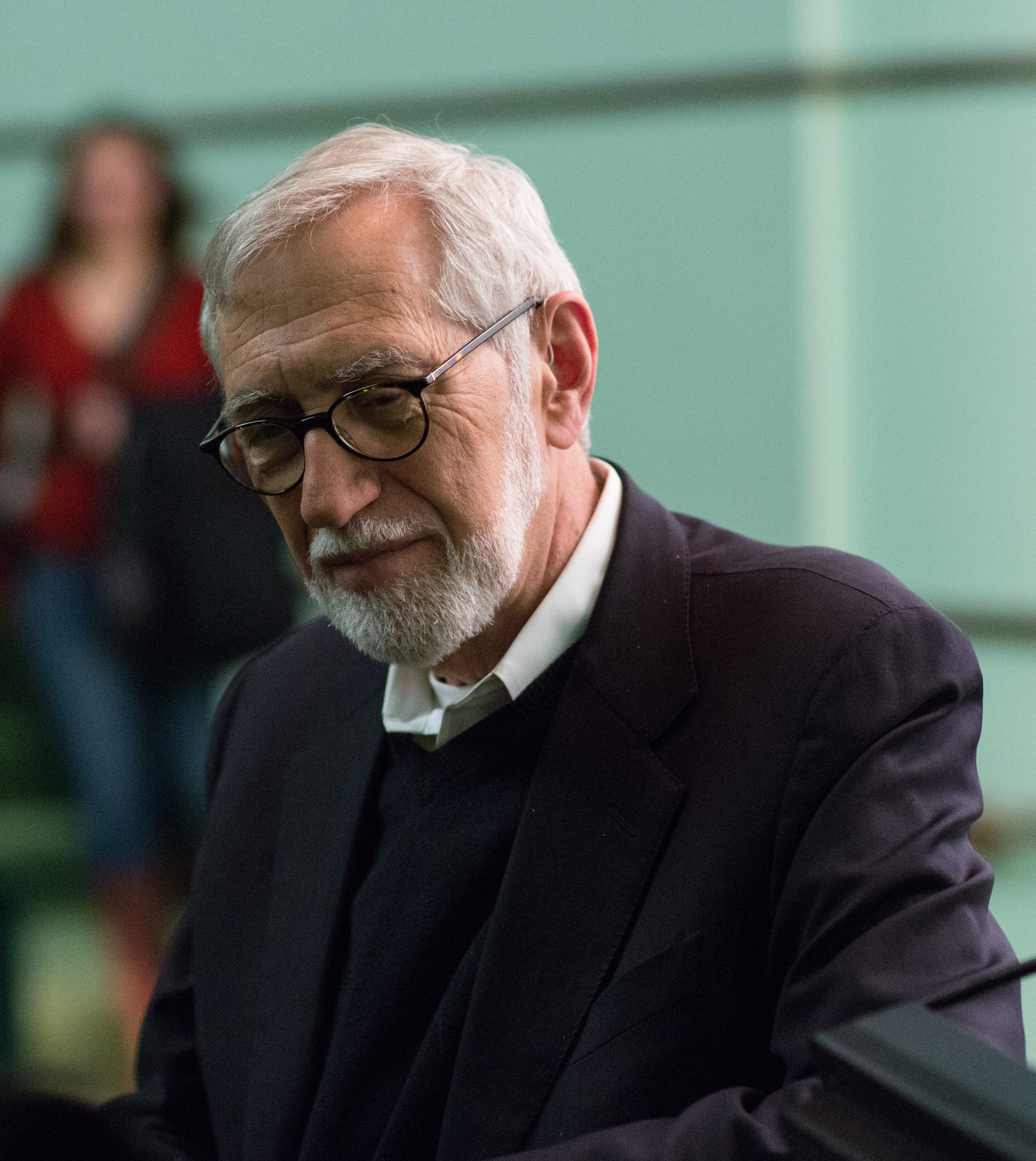
American landscape architect Laurie Olin

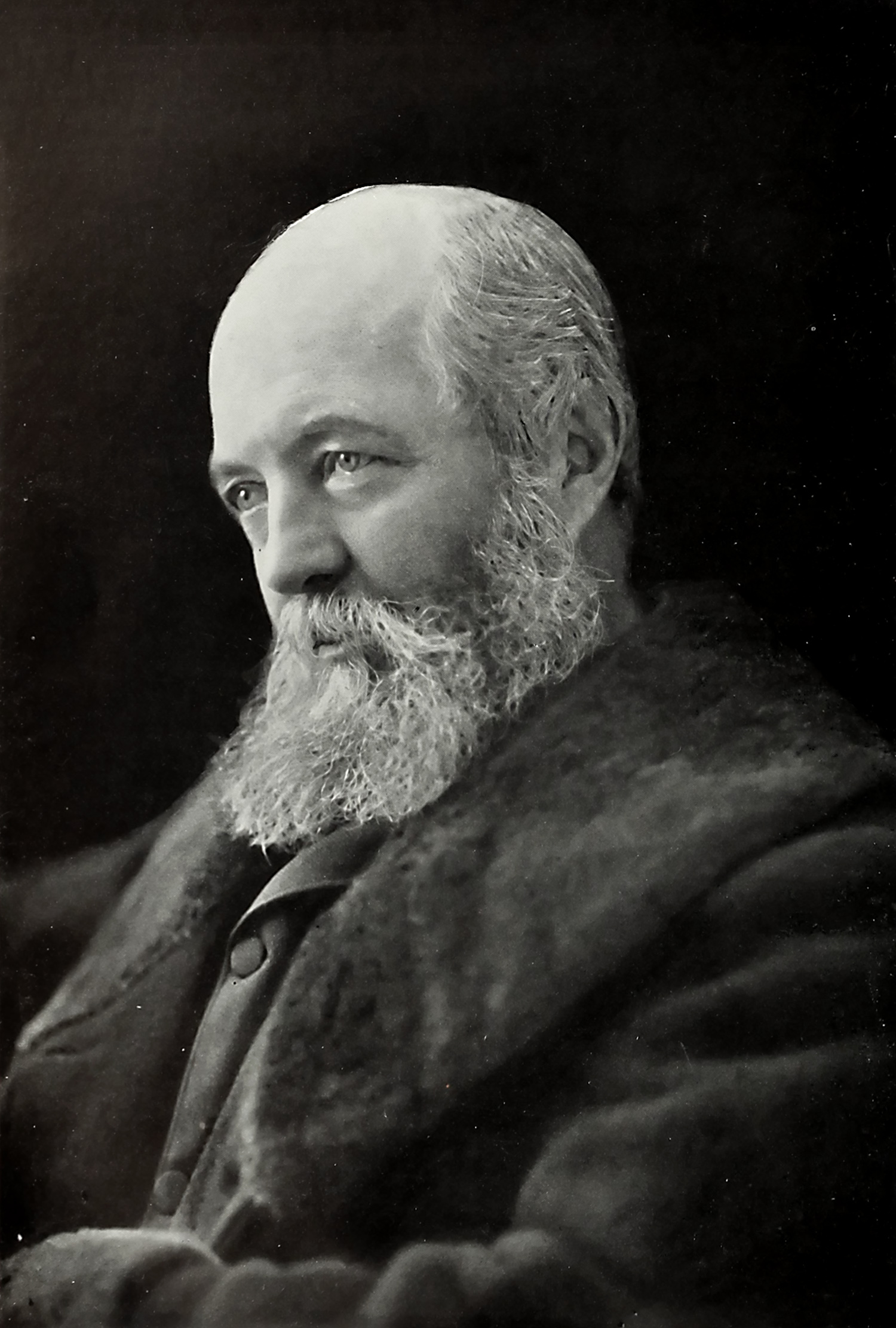
American architect Frederick Law Olmsted

- Harry Oakman (1906‍–‍2002)
- Cornelia Oberlander (1921‍–‍2021)
- Wolfgang Oehme (1930‍–‍2011)
- Ogata Kenzō (小形研三, 1912‍–‍1988)
- Ogawa Jihei VII (1860‍–‍1933)
- Ogawa Yōichi (ja:小川陽一 (国土交通官僚))
- Doan Ogden (1908‍–‍1989)
- Oguchi Kenzō (小口健蔵, b. 1952)
- Oguchi Motomi (小口基實, b. 1947)
- Ōhashi Kōshi (大橋鎬志, b. 1943)
- Oikawa Wataru (及川渉, b. 1954)
- Ōji Takako (応地丘子)
- Okada Norihisa (岡田憲久, b. 1950)
- Okami Yoshio (岡見義男, 1888‍–‍1963)
- Ayaakira Okazaki (岡崎文彬, 1908‍–‍1995)
- Benji Okubo (1904‍–‍1975)
- John Oldham (1907‍–‍1999)
- Laurie Olin (b. 1938)
- Frederick Law Olmsted (1822‍–‍1903)
- Frederick Law Olmsted Jr. (1870‍–‍1957)
- John Charles Olmsted (1852‍–‍1920)
- Ono Isamu (小野勇, 1903‍–‍1972)
- Ooi Michio (大井道夫, 1922‍–‍2007)
- Kate Orff (b. c. 1971)
- Orishimo Kichinobu (折下吉延, 1881‍–‍1966)
- Ōta Kenkichi (太田謙吉, 1891‍–‍1963)
- Ōtsuka Moriyasu (大塚守康, b. 1942)
- T. R. Otsuka (1868‍–‍c. 1950)
- George H. Otten (1889‍–‍1978)
- Piet Oudolf (b. 1944)
- Ōya Reijō (大屋霊城, 1890‍–‍1934)
- Ozawa Keijirō (小沢圭次郎, 1842‍–‍1932)
- Yüksel Öztan (1933‍–‍2010)

== P ==
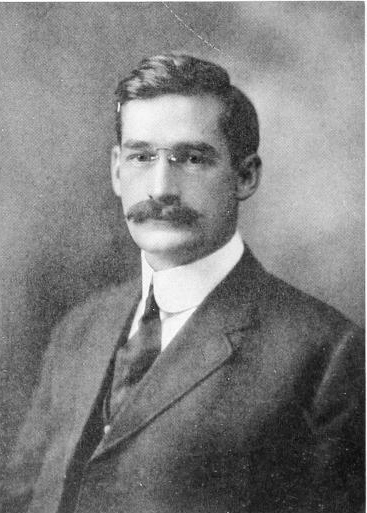
American architect Carl Francis Pilat

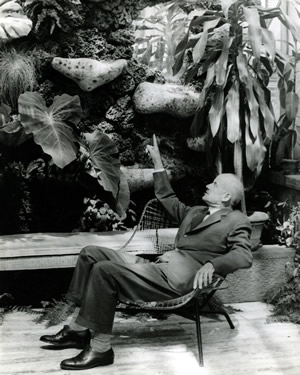
Italian architect Pietro Porcinai

- Francisco Páez de la Cadena (b. 1951)
- Raymond E. Page (1895‍–‍1992)
- Russell Page (1906‍–‍1985)
- Cary Millholland Parker (1902‍–‍2001)
- André Parmentier (1780‍–‍1830)
- Maria Teresa Parpagliolo (1903‍–‍1974)
- Samuel Parsons (1844‍–‍1923)
- Anthony du Gard Pasley (1929‍–‍2009)
- Elizabeth Greenleaf Pattee (1893‍–‍1991)
- Harriet Pattison (b. 1928)
- Joseph Paxton (1803‍–‍1865)
- Theodore Payne (1872‍–‍1963)
- Dan Pearson (b. 1964)
- Diane Pearson
- René Pechère (1908‍–‍2002)
- Elbert Peets (1886‍–‍1968)
- Antonio Perazzi (b. 1969)
- Sara Peschel
- Michiel Pesman (1887‍–‍1962)
- Harold Peto (1854‍–‍1933)
- Eduard Petzold (1815‍–‍1891)
- Wannaporn Phornprapha (b. 1968)
- Carl Francis Pilat (1876‍–‍1933)
- Cecil Pinsent (1884‍–‍1963)
- Fredrik Magnus Piper (1746‍–‍1824)
- Charles A. Platt (1861‍–‍1933)
- Lorena Ponce de León (b. 1976)
- Bremer Whidden Pond (1884‍–‍1959)
- Janet Meakin Poor (1929‍–‍2017)
- Pietro Porcinai (1910‍–‍1986)
- Bruce Porter (1865‍–‍1953)
- Joe A. Porter
- James Sturgis Pray (1871‍–‍1929)
- Antoine Predock (b. 1936)
- Uvedale Price (1747‍–‍1829)
- Wit-Olaf Prochnik (?‍–‍?)
- Militsa Prokhorova (1907‍–‍1959)
- Allain Provost (b. 1938)
- Lindsay Pryor (1915‍–‍1998)
- Hermann von Pückler-Muskau (1785‍–‍1871)
- Charles Punchard Jr. (1885‍–‍1920)

== R ==
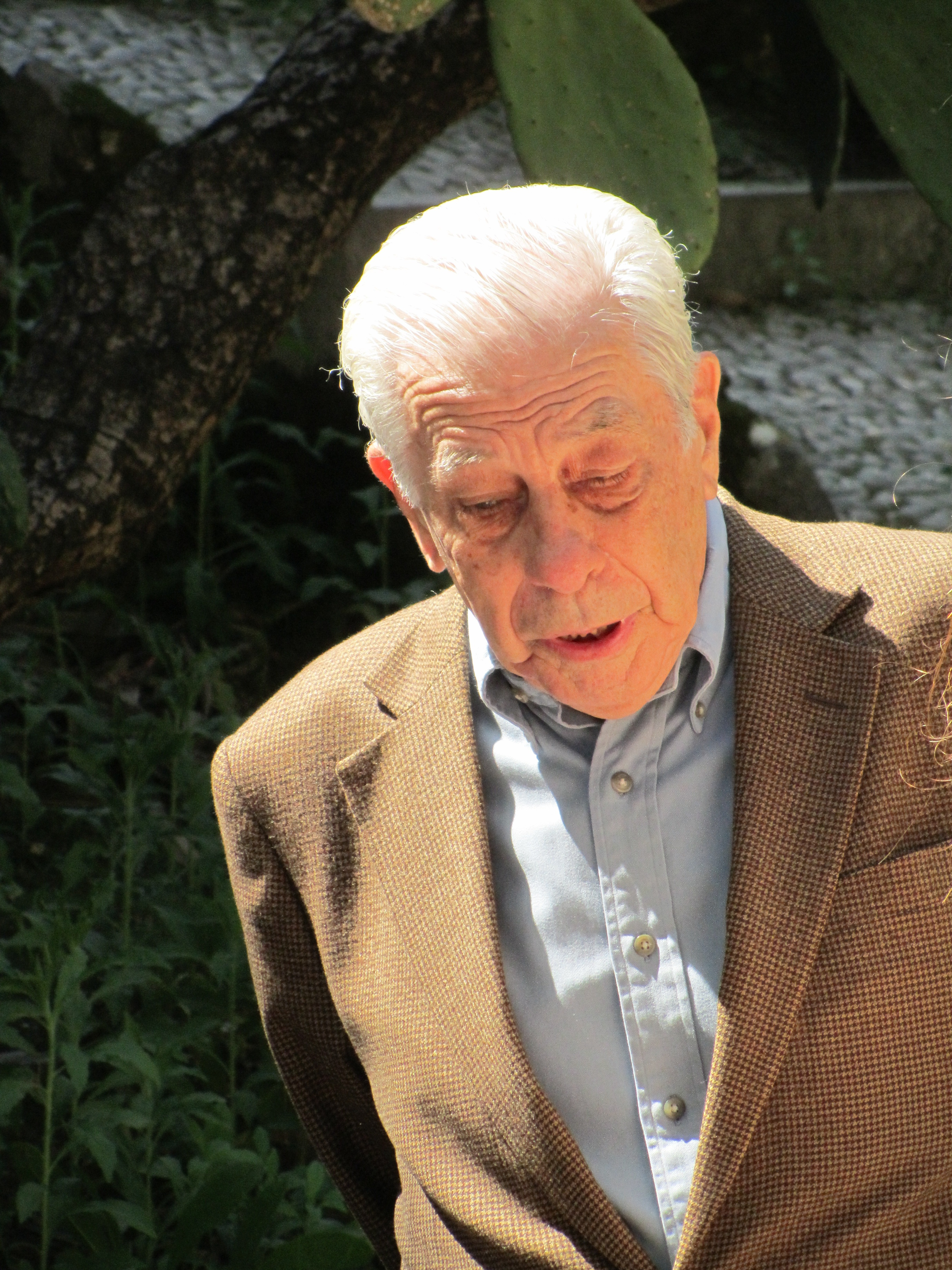
Portuguese architect Gonçalo Ribeiro Telles

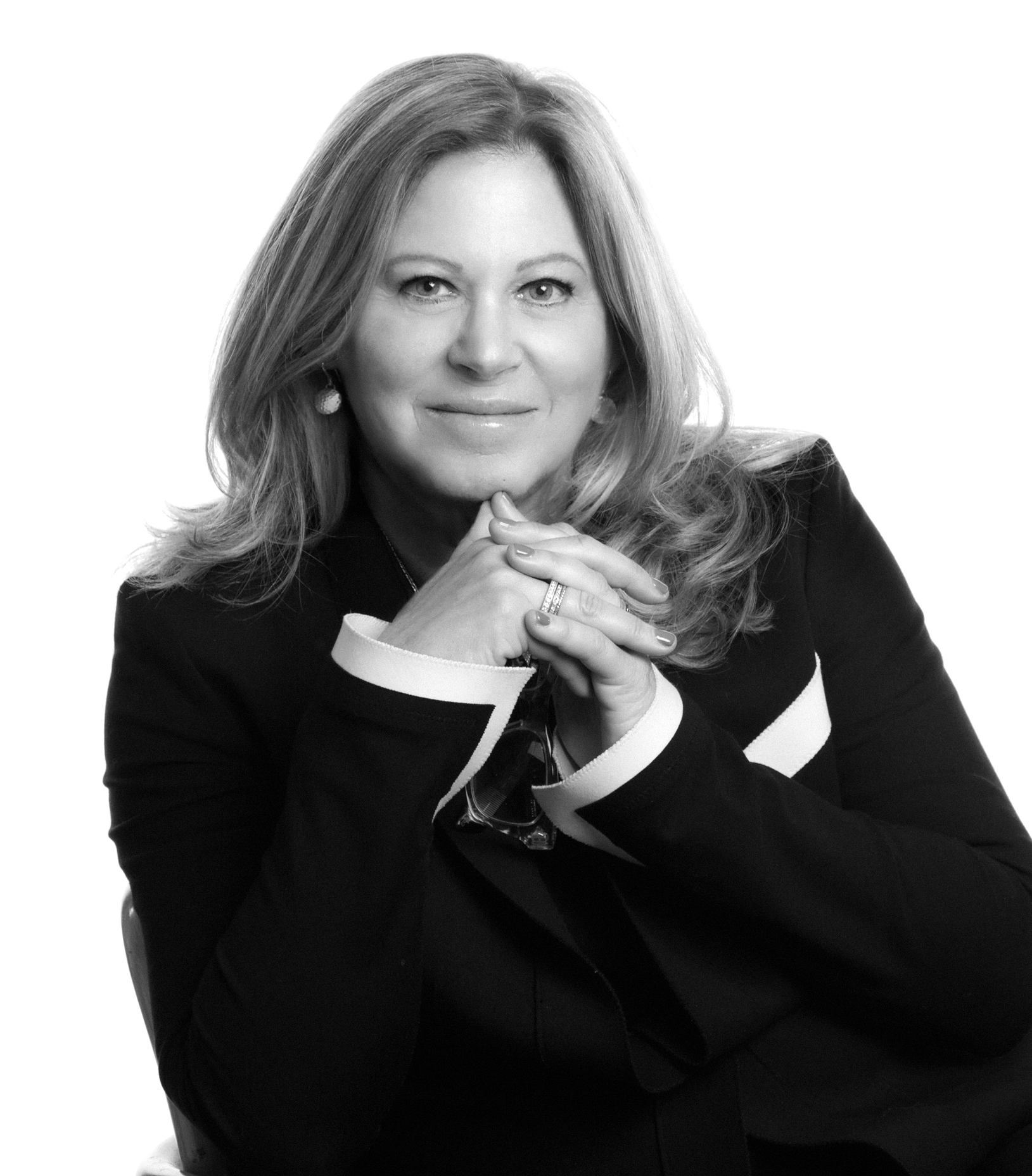
Canadian landscape architect Janet Rosenberg

- Charles Racine (1859‍–‍1935)
- François Racine de Monville (1734‍–‍1797)
- Joseph-Jacques Ramée (1764‍–‍1842)
- Simon Rastorguev (b. 1981)
- Elsa Rehmann (1886‍–‍1946)
- Guillermo Renner (1843‍–‍1924)
- Humphry Repton (1752‍–‍1818)
- Heinrich Ruzzo Reuss (1950‍–‍1999)
- Gonçalo Ribeiro Telles (1922‍–‍2020)
- Jane Silverstein Ries (1909‍–‍2005)
- Florence Bell Robinson (1885‍–‍1973)
- William Robinson (1838‍–‍1935)
- Elizabeth Barlow Rogers (b. 1936)
- Marius Røhne (1883‍–‍1966)
- Lanning Roper (1912‍–‍1983)
- James C. Rose (1913‍–‍1991)
- Janet Rosenberg
- Walter Rossow (1910‍–‍1992)
- Rudolph Rothe (1802‍–‍1877)
- Friedrich Leo von Rottenberger (1872‍–‍1938
- Nicolau Maria Rubió i Tudurí (1891‍–‍1981)
- Margie Ruddick
- Mien Ruys (1904‍–‍1999)

== S ==
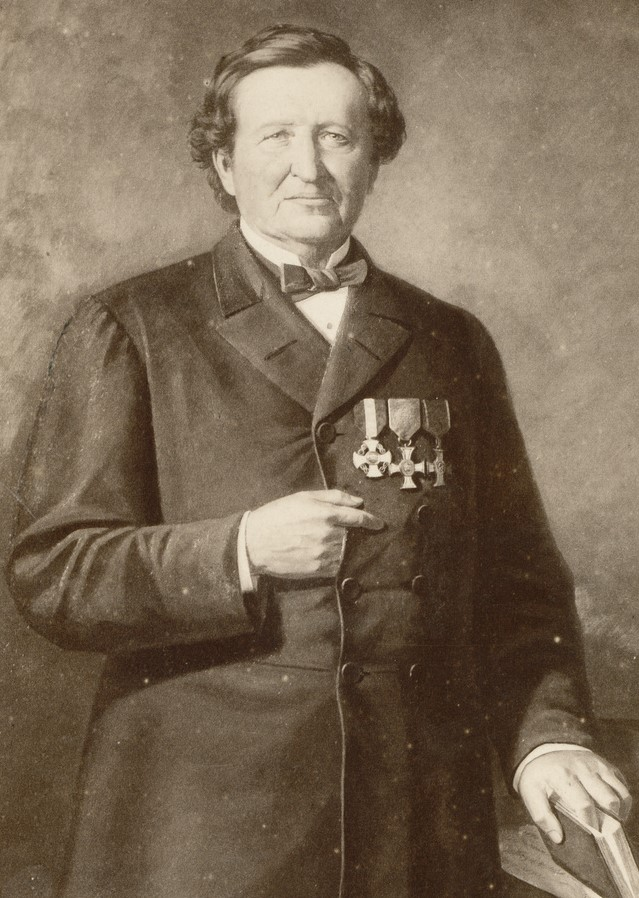
German-Australian botanist Moritz Richard Schomburgk

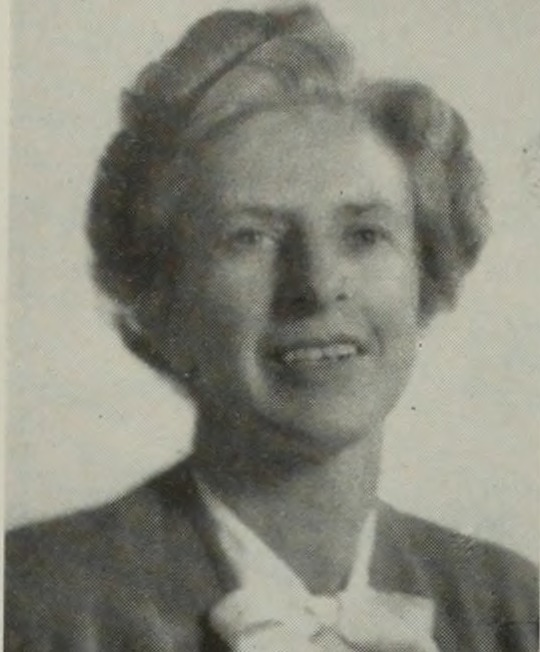
American architect Geraldine Knight Scott

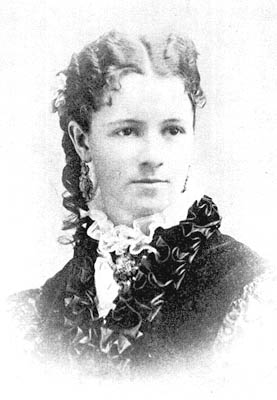
American architect Kate Sessions

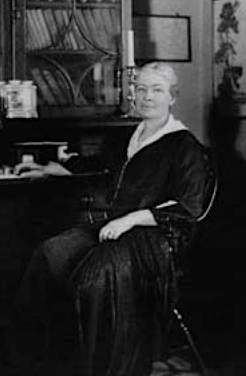
American architect Ellen Biddle Shipman

- Vita Sackville-West (1892‍–‍1962)
- Merel S. Sager (1899‍–‍1982)
- Katsuo Saitō (斉藤勝雄, 1893‍–‍1987)
- Saitō Kōji (斉藤浩二, b. 1947)
- Sakakibara Hachirō (榊原八朗, b. 1945)
- Sakata Shizuo (坂田静夫)
- Donald Katsumi Sakuma (1935‍–‍1975)
- Nagao Sakurai (1896‍–‍1973)
- Lucinda Sanders
- Sano Enshū (佐野越守)
- Sano Tansai (佐野旦斎)
- Sano Tōemon (佐野藤右衛門, b. 1928)
- Ildefonso P. Santos Jr. (1929‍–‍2014)
- Henry Winthrop Sargent (1810‍–‍1882)
- Maud Sargent (1899‍–‍1992)
- Hideo Sasaki (1919‍–‍2000)
- Sasaki Yōji (佐々木葉二, b. 1947)
- Satō Akira (佐藤昌, 1903‍–‍2003)
- John Hennessy Saul (1819‍–‍1897)
- William Saunders (1822‍–‍1900)
- Herbert R. Schaal (b. 1940)
- Bengt Schalin (1889‍–‍1982)
- Maurus Schifferli (b. 1973)
- Mario Schjetnan (b. 1945)
- Rainer Schmidt (b. 1954)
- Camillo Karl Schneider (1876‍–‍1951)
- Alina Scholtz (1908‍–‍1996)
- Richard Schomburgk (1811‍–‍1891)
- Edith Schryver (1901‍–‍1984)
- E. O. Schwagerl (1842‍–‍1910)
- Martha Schwartz (b. 1950)
- Friedrich Ludwig von Sckell (1750‍–‍1823)
- Geraldine Knight Scott (1904‍–‍1989)
- Thomas Warren Sears (1880‍–‍1966)
- J. J. Sexby (1847‍–‍1924)
- Peter Shepheard (1913‍–‍2002)
- Shōji Seike (清家省二, b. 1949)
- Sekiguchi Eitarō (関口鍈太郎, 1896‍–‍1981)
- Senge Tetsumaro (千家哲麿, 1907‍–‍1995)
- Kate Sessions (1857‍–‍1940)
- Mary Elizabeth Sharpe (1884‍–‍1985)
- Ruth Shellhorn (1909‍–‍2006)
- Bonnie Sherk (1945‍–‍2021)
- Shigematsu Toshinori (重松敏則, 1945‍–‍2016)
- Kanto Shigemori (重森完途, 1923‍–‍1992)
- Mirei Shigemori (1896‍–‍1975)
- Shiihara Hyōichi (椎原兵市, 1884‍–‍1966)
- Shiiya Yūichi (椎谷尤一, b. 1945)
- Shimizu Masao (清水政雄, b. 1939)
- Shimizu Masayuki (清水正之, 1931‍–‍2016)
- Shimoda Akihiro (下田明宏, b. 1955)
- Shimohirao Shitomi (下平尾蔀, b. 1944)
- Shinji Isoya (進士五十八, b. 1944)
- Shiojima Dai (塩島大, 1934‍–‍1985)
- Shiota Takashi (塩田敏志, 1928‍–‍2019)
- Takeo Shiota (1881‍–‍1943)
- Ellen Biddle Shipman (1869‍–‍1950)
- Shirasuna Nobuo (白砂伸夫, b. 1953)
- Arthur Asahel Shurcliff (1870‍–‍1957)
- Henry Augustus Siebrecht (1849‍–‍1934)
- John O. Simonds (1913‍–‍2005)
- Ossian Cole Simonds (1855‍–‍1931)
- Vladimir Sitta
- Kevin Warren Sloan (1957‍–‍2021)
- Ken Smith (b. 1953)
- Sōami (d. 1525)
- Barbara Stauffacher Solomon (b. 1928)
- Sōma Taketane (相馬孟胤, 1889‍–‍1936)
- Carl Theodor Sørensen (1893‍–‍1979)
- Philip Southcote (1698‍–‍1758)
- Laurinda Hope Spear (b. 1950)
- Anne Whiston Spirn (b. 1947)
- Fletcher Steele (1885‍–‍1971)
- Achva Benzinberg Stein
- Ezra C. Stiles (1891‍–‍1974)
- John Godfrey William Stoddart Ayres (1929‍–‍)
- Edward Durell Stone Jr. (1932‍–‍2009)
- Ellis Stones (1895‍–‍1975)
- Adolph Strauch (1822‍–‍1883)
- Tom Stuart-Smith (b. 1960)
- Butler Sturtevant (1899‍–‍1971)
- Robert Sturtevant (1892‍–‍1955)
- Jorge Subirana
- Suematsu Shirō (末松四郎, b. 1929)
- Hirofumi Suga (b. 1972)
- Sugio Kunie (杉尾邦江, b. 1936)
- Sugiura Sakae (杉浦榮, b. 1965)
- Suminami Yūji (ja:角南勇二)
- Suzuki Masamichi (鈴木昌道, 1935‍–‍2016)
- Suzuki Naoe (鈴木直衛, 1949‍–‍2014)
- Carl Gustav Swensson (1861‍–‍1910)
- Stephen Switzer (1682‍–‍1745)

== T ==
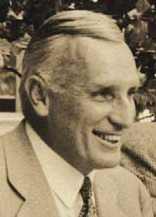
American architect Albert Davis Taylor

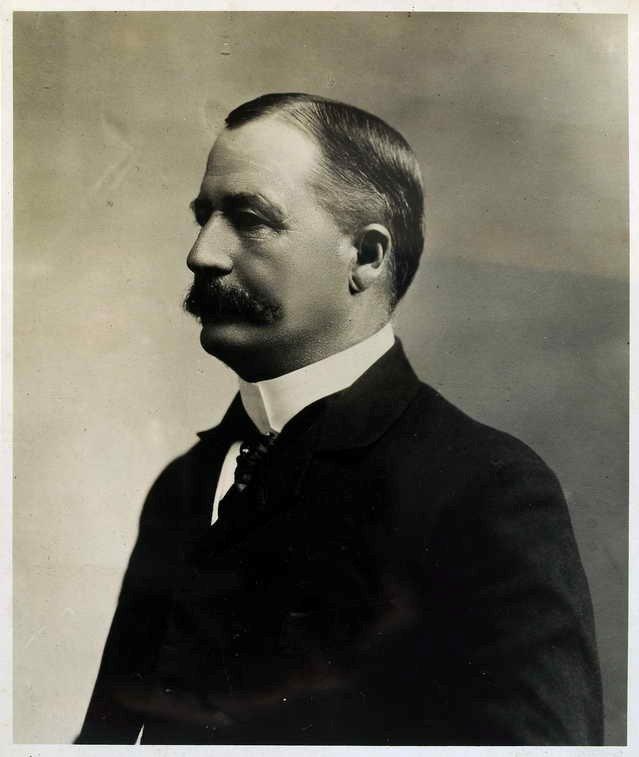
French-Argentine architect Carlos Thays

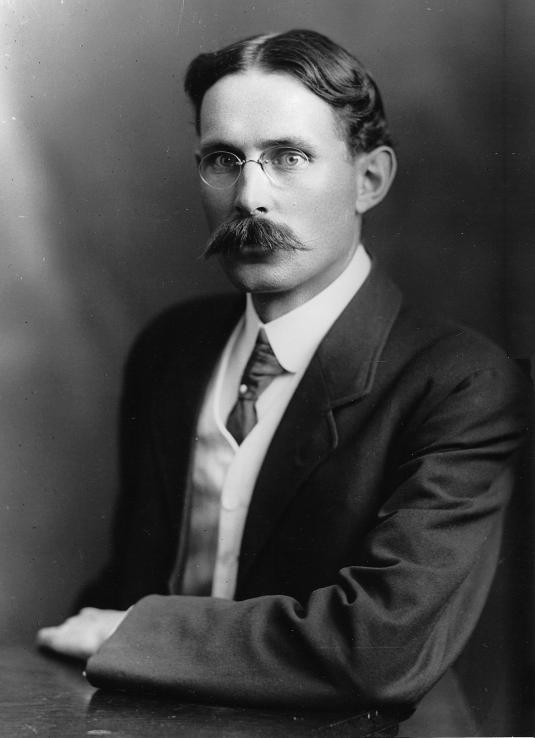
Canadian architect Frederick Todd

- Tabata Sadatoshi (田畑貞寿, b. 1931)
- Grace Tabor (1874‍–‍1971)
- Tábora Pena, Fernando (1927‍–‍?)
- Taga Yōsuke (田賀陽介, b. 1964)
- Taji Rokurō (田治六郎, 1904‍–‍1978)
- Takamura Kōhei (高村弘平, 1901‍–‍1989)
- Takano Fumiaki (高野文彰, b. 1944)
- Takada Kazumi (高田和己)
- Takeda Naoki (竹田直樹, b. 1961)
- Tanaka Taiami (田中泰阿弥, 1898‍–‍1978)
- Masaaki Takanashi (髙梨雅明)
- Tsuyoshi Tamura (田村剛, 1890‍–‍1979)
- Tanada Kajūrō (棚田嘉十郎, 1860‍–‍1921)
- Tanaka Kiichi (田中喜一)
- Mitsuru Tanaka (田中充, b. 1954)
- David Tannock (1873‍–‍1952)
- Tasaka Yoshinori (田阪美徳, 1895‍–‍1969)
- Tase Michio (田瀬理夫, b. 1949)
- Tachi Eiji (舘粲児, b. 1893)
- Matsunosuke Tatsui (龍居松之助, 1884‍–‍1961)
- Tatsui Takenosuke (龍居竹之介, b. 1931)
- Tawara Hiromi (俵浩三, 1930‍–‍1990)
- Albert Davis Taylor (1883‍–‍1951)
- Edgar Taylor (1886‍–‍1979)
- Mario Terzic (b. 1945)
- Henry Teuscher (1891‍–‍1984)
- Carlos Thays (1849‍–‍1934)
- Paul Thiene (1880‍–‍1971)
- John Thompson (1941‍–‍2015)
- Henry Avray Tipping (1855‍–‍1933)
- William Tite (1798‍–‍1873)
- Frederick Todd (1876‍–‍1948)
- James Towillis
- François-Marie Treyve (1847‍–‍1906)
- Inigo Triggs (1876‍–‍1923)
- Peter Trowbridge
- Tsujimoto Tomoko (辻本智子)
- Tsuji Sōhan (辻宗範, 1758‍–‍1840)
- Tsujio Hitoshi (辻尾仁志, b. 1964)
- Tsukahara Michio (塚原道夫, b. 1951)
- Tsunemura Noriyuki (恒村則之, b. 1941)
- Yoshiki Toda (戸田芳樹, b. 1947)
- Takuma Tono (戸野琢磨, 1891‍–‍1985)
- David Tulloch
- Christopher Tunnard (1910‍–‍1979)
- Harry Turbott (1930‍–‍2016)
- Roger Turner (b. 1943)
- Tom Turner (b. 1946)
- Anthony Tyznik (1925‍–‍2016)

== U ==
- Uehara Hirofumi (上原啓史, b. 1947)
- Uehara Keiji (上原敬二, 1889‍–‍1981)
- Ueno Yasushi (上野泰, b. 1938)
- Takeo Uesugi (1940‍–‍2016)
- Uesugi Toshikazu (上杉俊和)
- Ryōko Ueyama (上山良子)
- Yasuo Uchida (ja:内田裕郎)
- Rudolph Ulrich (1840‍–‍1906)
- Francis Townsend Underhill (1863‍–‍1929)
- Urasaki Masakatsu (浦崎正勝, b. 1976)
- Matthew Urbanski (b. 1963)
- Alice Upham Smith (1908‍–‍1998)

== V ==
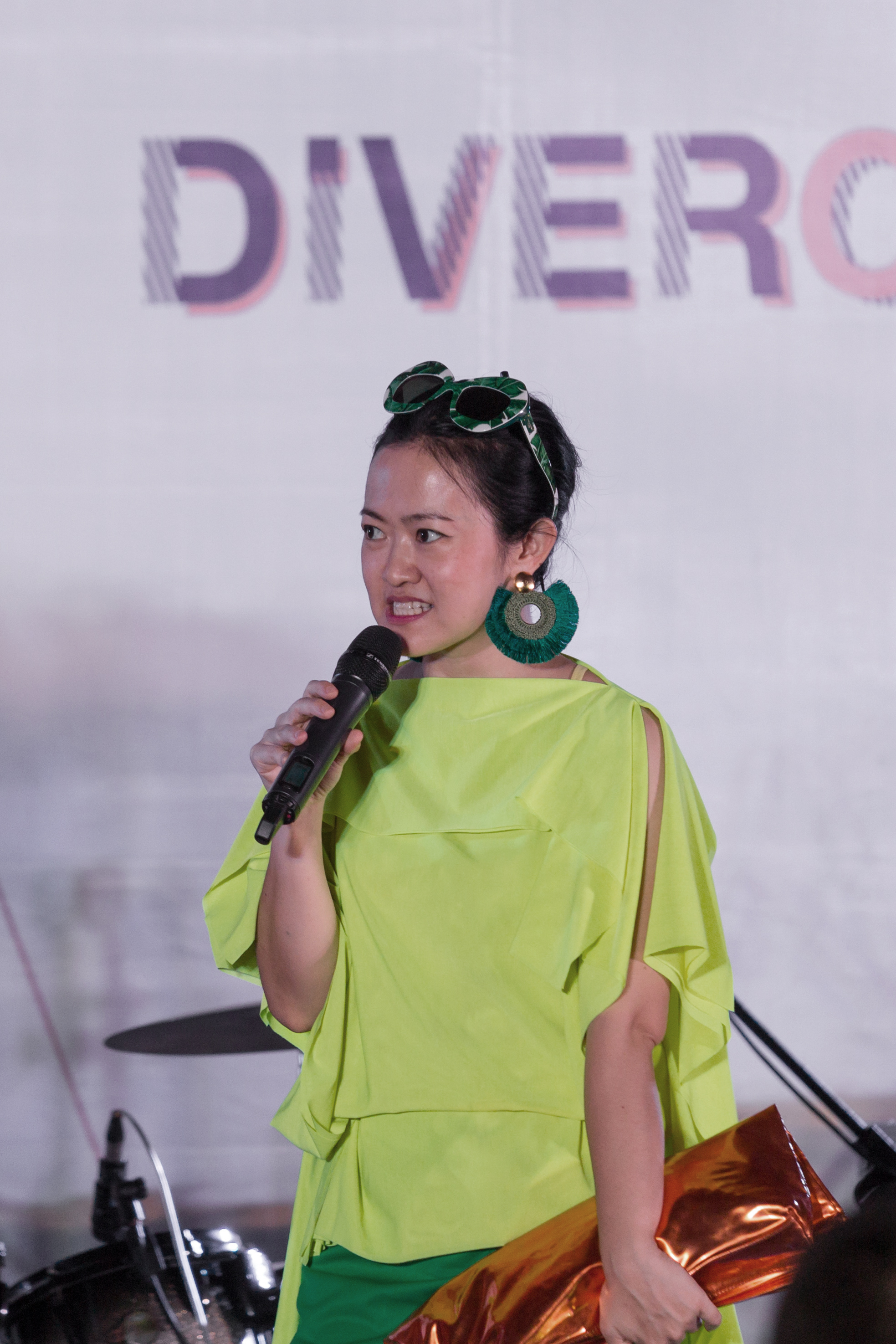
Thai architect Kotchakorn Voraakhom

- Pongsak Vadhanasindhu (b. 1954)
- John Vanbrugh (c. 1664‍–‍1726)
- Barbara van den Broek (1932‍–‍2001)
- Louis Van der Swaelmen (1883‍–‍1929)
- Michael Van Valkenburgh (b. 1951)
- Gabrielle van Zuylen (1933‍–‍2010)
- Don Vaughan (b. 1937)
- Calvert Vaux (1824‍–‍1895)
- Downing Vaux (1856‍–‍1926)
- André Vera (1881‍–‍1971)
- Peter Anton von Verschaffelt (1710‍–‍1793)
- Thomas Chalmers Vint (1894‍–‍1967)
- Ferruccio Vitale (1875‍–‍1933)
- Günther Vogt (b. 1957)
- Edwina von Gal
- Kotchakorn Voraakhom (b. 1981)

== W ==
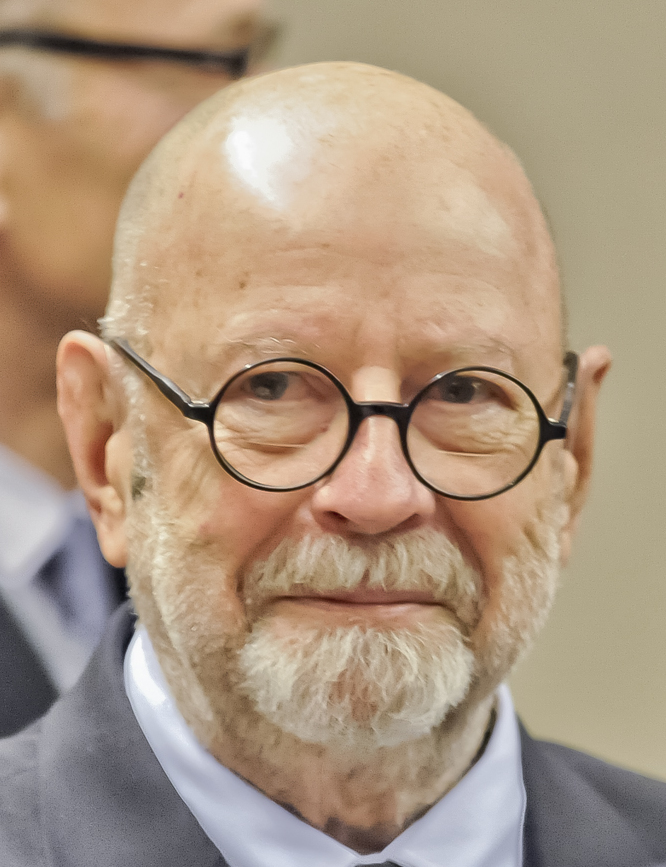
American architect Peter Walker

American architect Frank Albert Waugh

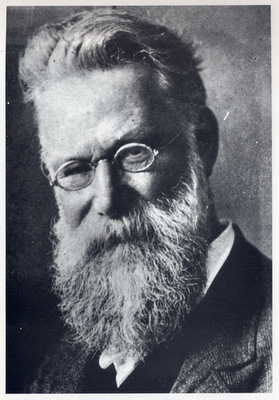
German garden designer Ludwig Winter

- Alexander Wadsworth (1806‍–‍1898)
- Wakisaka Chishirō (脇坂千四郎, b. 1865)
- Wakō Kenji (若生謙二, b. 1954)
- Wakui Masayuki (涌井雅之, b. 1945)
- Peter Walker (b. 1932)
- Edna Walling (1896‍–‍1973)
- Ganna Walska (1887‍–‍1984)
- Mina Klabin Warchavchik (1896‍–‍1969)
- Washio Kin'ya (鷲尾金弥, b. 1936)
- Watanabe Toshio (渡辺俊雄, b. 1951)
- Frank Albert Waugh (1869‍–‍1943)
- Richard K. Webel (1900‍–‍2000)
- Nelva Weber (1908‍–‍1990)
- Roland Weber (1909‍–‍1997)
- Jacob Weidenmann (1829‍–‍1893)
- Udo Weilacher (b. 1963)
- Richard Weller
- Wen Zhenheng (1585‍–‍1645)
- Robert Weygand (b. 1948)
- Edith Wharton (1862‍–‍1937)
- Perry Hunt Wheeler (1913‍–‍1989)
- Stanley Hart White (1891‍–‍1979)
- Arthur Wiechula (1867‍–‍1941)
- Ron Wigginton (b. 1944)
- Made Wijaya (1953‍–‍2016)
- Fanny Wilkinson (1855‍–‍1951)
- David Williston (1868‍–‍1962)
- Albert Wilson (1903‍–‍1996)
- Andrew Wilson
- Ludwig Winter (1846‍–‍1912)
- Javier Winthuysen (1874‍–‍1956)
- Theodore Wirth (1863‍–‍1949)
- Jacques Wirtz (1924‍–‍2018)
- Henry Wise (c. 1653‍–‍1738)
- John Caspar Wister (1887‍–‍1982)
- Thomas Woltz (b. 1967)
- Fernando Wong (b. 1975)
- Robert Woodward (1923‍–‍2010)
- Isabella Worn (1869‍–‍1950)
- Megan Wraight (1961‍–‍2020)
- Henry Wright (1878‍–‍1936)
- Lloyd Wright (1890‍–‍1978)

== Y ==
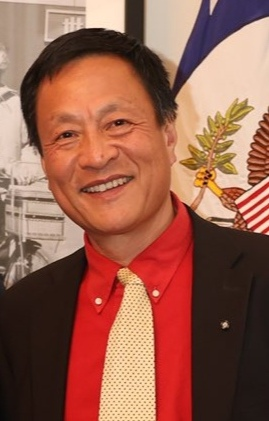
Chinese architect Kongjian Yu

- Kazushi Yamada (山田和司)
- Yamamoto Norihisa (山本紀久, b. 1940)
- Yamamoto Norio (山本教夫, b. 1937)
- Yamamoto Tomio (山本富雄, b. 1963)
- Yamauchi Rokurō (山内六郎, b. 1906)
- Yamazaki Ryō (山崎亮, b. 1973)
- Florence Yoch (1890‍–‍1972)
- Yokoyama Mitsuo (横山光雄, 1909‍–‍2010)
- Yokoyama Shinji (横山信二, 1893‍–‍1938)
- Yoshida Masahiro (吉田昌弘, b. 1943)
- Yoshimura Iwao (吉村巌, 1900‍–‍1970)
- Yoshimura Jun'ichi (吉村純一, b. 1956)
- Yoshimura Kaneo (吉村金男)
- Yoshimura Motoo (吉村元男, b. 1937)
- Kongjian Yu (1963‍–‍2025)

== Z ==
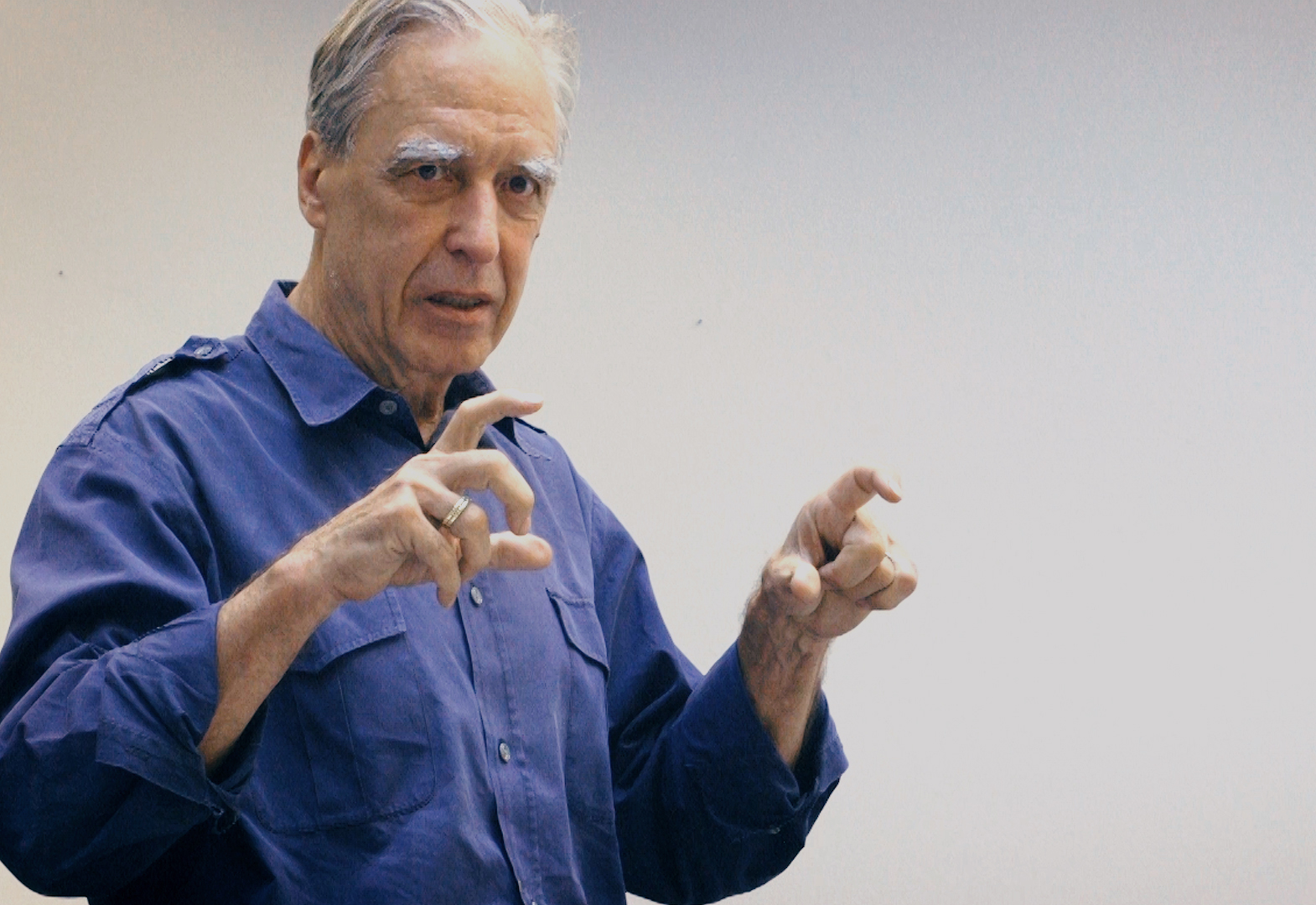
German architect Klaus Zillich

- Zen'ami (善阿弥, 1386‍–‍1482)
- Sara Zewde (b. 1985)
- Klaus Zillich (1942–2026)
- Yufan Zhu (朱育帆)

== See also ==
- Landscape or garden designers
- List of professional gardeners
- List of urban planners
