= Dan Euser =

Canadian landscape architect

Dan Euser is a Canadian artist, sculptor, designer, and landscape architect specializing in water features. His works include various dynamic water sculptures for landmark architectural installations.

== Art works ==
Euser's most well known works of art include the centerpiece for Toronto's Sankofa Square, as well as North America's largest human-made waterfall, installed as part of the National September 11 Memorial at the former site of the World Trade Center in New York City. A portion of the waterfall for the World Trade Center Memorial, "Reflecting Absence," was prototyped at Euser's studio in 2005, for testing and design purposes.

== Awards ==
- honored as the water feature architect for the award winning Milwaukee Art Museum addition in 2001.
- OALA Pinacle Award for outstanding professional achievement in 2006.
