= Kirsten Bauer =

Australian landscape architect

Kirsten Bauer is an Australian landscape architect notable for her contributions to practice, education and research. She is the Director of Aspect Studios in Melbourne.

== Background ==
Bauer has a Master of Architecture (Landscape Architecture) by Design and a Bachelor of Landscape Architecture with Honours, both from RMIT University. She is a fellow and former Victorian Chapter President of the Australian Institute of Landscape Architects (AILA). She is a current member of the Office of the Victorian Government Architect's Victorian Design Review Panel and a board member of Birrarung Council (a statutory body established by the Victorian Government to protect the Yarra River for the benefit and enjoyment of future generations). Bauer is an adjunct professor of Landscape Architecture at RMIT University and regularly lectures at university and industry events in Australia and abroad. She co-curated the 2019 International Festival of Landscape Architecture, held in Melbourne. Bauer has guest edited multiple editions of Landscape Architecture Australia including issues 165 – The Square and The Park and 140 – Creating Communities.

== Key Projects ==
- Prahran Square, Victoria 2020 with Lyons Architects
- Yagan Square, Perth 2017 with Lyons Architects and Iredale Pedersen Hook Architects
- Victoria Harbour development, Melbourne Docklands 2011-2014
- Victorian Desalination Plant, Wonthaggi Victoria 2009-2014 with Practical Ecology, peckvonhartel, ARM Architects and Fytogreen
- Monash University Caulfield and Clayton Campus Masterplans 2011 with MGS Architects and Irwinconsult
