= Militsa Prokhorova =

Soviet architect

- Born: 1907; Moscow, Russian Empire
- Died: 1959 (aged 51–52)
- Education: Vkhutemas
- Occupation: Landscape architect
- Projects: Moscow State University

Militsa Prokhorova (1907–1959, Moscow) was one of the founders of Soviet landscape architecture.

== Biography ==
Militsa Prokhorova was born and grew up in the Novogireyevo District of Moscow in a family of engineers. In 1924, she entered Vkhutemas, where she studied with Nikolai Ladovsky and Konstantin Melnikov. She graduated in 1928, a member of ASNOVA. She entered the Design and Planning Workshop at the TsPKiO, named after I. Gorky. She also found work in Goselenstroy, the Moscow city planning department. She had a major part in the landscaping of the Moscow State University in the Lenin Hills in the 1950s.
