= Horst Baeseler =

German landscape architect (1930–2004)

Hoesrt Baeseler
- Born: 10 March 1930; Dresden, Saxony, Germany
- Died: 20 September 2004 (aged 74); Berlin, Germany
- Occupation: Architect

Hoesrt Baeseler (10 March 1930 – 20 September 2004) was a German architect. He was part of the Reinhold Lingner school of garden and landscape architects.

== Life ==
Horst Baeseler was born in Dresden in the southern part of what was then central Germany. His father was a pharmacist. He attended school at the city's prestigious King George Gymnasium, but his school days were prematurely terminated in February 1945 when the school was destroyed. The war ended in May 1945 and Dresden found itself in the Soviet occupation zone of what remained of Germany, controlled by the Soviet military. Four years later the entire "zone" was subsequently relaunched as a stand-alone East German state under Soviet sponsorship, the German Democratic Republic formally founded in October 1949. Baeseler trained between 1945 and 1948 as a gardener at the Paul Hauber Tree School in Dresden-Tolkewitz. He then started work as a gardener, focusing on herbaceous shrubs and trees. He also continued to train, now with Johann Greiner at the Horticultural Academy in Pillnitz. In 1951 he took a part in a machinery training course for gardeners in Quedlinburg.

Between 1951 and 1991, at the behest of Johann Greiner, Horst Baeseler was an employee of the National Building Academy. Here, until 1955, he was working with Reinhold Lingner, the country's leading garden and landscape architect. The two of them worked on the landscaping for the Wilhelm Pieck Pioneers' Republic in Altenhof, north of Berlin: this was to become the principal recreational and training/indoctrination camp for selected Young Pioneers. Greiner and Baseler later worked together on the Stalinstadt Arts and Sports centre in Eisenhüttenstadt. Between 1952 and 1955 Baeseler studied at the Humboldt University of Berlin, emerging with an engineering degree in Landscape planning. For the next three decades he was involved in a series of high-profile East German construction projects.

In 1981 Baeseler was involved in an East German Development Support project in Mozambique. His contribution involved garden and landscape construction projects. Between 1991 and 1996 he worked at the Institute for Regional Development and Structural Planning.

Horst Baeseler died in Berlin in 2004. He left behind him numerous texts, reports. working papers, letters, books, plans and sketches.
