= Jinny Blom =

British landscape architect

- Occupation: British landscape architect
- Years active: 25
- Notable work: The Thoughtful Gardener: An Intelligent Approach to Garden Design (2017)

Jinny Blom is a landscape gardener who began her London-based landscape design practice in 2000. Since then, she has created gardens and large estates all over the world. She has created therapeutic gardens for the NHS charity CW+, most recently for the new ICU at Chelsea & Westminster Hospital where she is Artist-in-Residence. The garden forms part of academic research into the positive effects of biophilia on health.

In 2002 HRH the Prince of Wales chose Jinny to help co-design his Healing Garden for the RHS Chelsea Flower Show. She went on to design two further Chelsea show gardens for Laurent-Perrier in 2006 and 2007, winning Gold. She returned in 2013 with Prince Harry’s first excursion into the show, in its Centenary year, with a conceptual garden designed to raise awareness of the HIV epidemic in Lesotho.

Jinny trained and practised as a transpersonal psychologist and psychotherapist, working for many years in mental health. In 1996 she chose to devote herself to her lifelong interest in natural landscapes and gardens. She has been a columnist for The Times, contributed regularly to radio and television worldwide, and in 2002 won BBC Radio Broadcaster of the Year for her Radio 4 Woman's Hour feature following the King’s Chelsea Garden production. Jinny has been nominated Woman of the Year three times - in 2002, 2007 and 2013 - for her services to society.

Following The Thoughtful Gardener (2017), What Makes a Garden was published in October 2023.

What Makes a Garden won Gardening Book of the Year in 2024 and was accompanied by a podcast series with guests as varied as Tim Walker, Olivia Laing and Brian Eno.

== Works ==
- Blom, J. (2017). The Thoughtful Gardener: An Intelligent Approach to Garden Design. Jacqui Small. ISBN 978-1-911127-54-3.
- Blom, J. (2023). What Makes a Garden: A considered approach to garden design Frances Lincoln. ISBN 978-0711282957. books.google.com preview
