= Marc P. Keane =

Marc Peter Keane, a graduate of Cornell University, is an American landscape architect and author. He lived in Kyoto, Japan, for nearly 20 years, and specializes in Japanese garden design. Presently, after many years living in Ithaca, New York, he has moved his home and studio back to Kyoto, Japan.

He is the author of several books about garden design: Japanese Garden Design, Sakuteiki: Visions of the Japanese Garden, The Art of Setting Stones, and The Japanese Tea Garden.

Keane has worked as a lecturer in the Department of Environmental Design at the Kyoto University of Art and Design and at Cornell University, and is a fellow at the Research Center for Japanese Garden Art, Kyoto, Japan, and the Institute for Medieval Japanese Studies, New York. He has lectured widely throughout the United States, England, and Japan.

Keane also acted as chairman of Kyoto Mitate International for many years, a non-profit organization that worked to revitalize Kyoto's traditional environments and cultural heritage.
