= Forbes Lipschitz =

Forbes Lipschitz is an academic who studies the role of design in making industrial farming ecologically and socially productive. She is an associate professor and at Ohio State University in the landscape architecture section of the Knowlton School of Architecture and founder of The Working Landscapes Lab.

== Background and education ==
Lipschitz grew up in Little Rock, Arkansas. She attended Harvard University's Graduate School of Design and earned a Master of Landscape Architecture. She also has a Bachelor of Art in environmental aesthetics from Pomona College, where she graduated cum laude.

== Professional career ==
Lipschitz’ research focuses contemporary agro-industrial activities and food security. Her position at Ohio State University is funded by the Initiative for Food and AgriCultural Transformation, a program that focuses on food security. She is particularly interested in meat and fish production, receiving a grant in 2014 to study catfish production, processing, and distribution centers in the American South. Her graduate school thesis focused on poultry production in Northwest Arkansas; she critiqued its environmental and social impacts while exploring opportunities to make it more ecologically-supportable and productive. She has also explored the role of geospatial analysis in understanding agricultural landscape systems, and she leads workshops on new applications for geographic information systems.

Her research seeks to find examples of agriculture that is harmonious with local ecology and fulfills important social functions. Her work with catfish farming explores whether the ponds that compose the farms are an example of good ecology in an agricultural setting, noting how the farms mimic the natural wetlands of the deep south. Working with Justine Holzman, Lipschitz discovered that these areas are essential to migrating waterfowl. Lipschitz also discovered that catfish farming has an important social role as a source of employment.

She recently spearheaded an exhibition with Justine Holzman, On the Pond, which uses photographs, text, maps, and digital art to make the case for catfish farming as important sustainable agriculture. Her advocacy around catfish farming has led to an interest in how to represent information about landscapes, and her most recent work explores the role geospatial analysis can play in rethinking landscapes of American agriculture.

As a professor, Lipschitz teaches both studio and seminar courses. Topics include landscape planning and geographic information systems. She was previously Suzanne L. Turner Professor at Louisiana State University in the school of landscape architecture. She and Holzman also teach geographic information systems and geovisualization at other schools, including the University of Tennessee Knoxville. The workshops emphasize new methods for designing with geospatial data.

Lipschitz has spoken at University of Illinois's Freshwater conference, as well as the "Identity: Impact By Design" conference and the annual conference hosted by the Tennessee and Ohio chapters of the American Society of Landscape Architects, respectively.

=== Exhibitions ===
- Les Jardins de Metis: 15 Knots (2012)
- Delta Cultural Center: One the Pond (2017)

=== Awards ===
- Graham Foundation Grant: From Pond to Plate: the Landscape of Catfish Production and Processing in the Deep South (2014)
- ASLA Certificate of Merit Award: The New Regional Pattern: Syncing Livestock Production and Urban Systems in the Broiler Belt
