= Catherin Bull =

Australian architect (born 1949)

- Born: 1949 (age 76–77)
- Citizenship: Australian
- Occupations: Architect; academic; professor; consultant

Academic background
- Education: University of Melbourne (MLArch); Harvard University (DrDes)
- Thesis: Sustainable Tourism in Remote Australia: Strategies for Physical Planning and Infrastructure (1991)

Academic work
- Discipline: Architecture
- Institutions: Emeritus professor of Landscape Architecture at the Melbourne; Adjunct professor at QUT; Board member at Building Queensland; Design Directorate member of Urban Growth NSW

Catherin Bull (born 1949) is an Australian landscape architect, scholar, professor, and former commissioner of the Land and Environment Court of New South Wales.

== Career ==
During her time as commissioner of the Land and Environment Court in New South Wales, she helped plan and design review panels and boards for many organizations, including the National Capital Authority, the ACT Planning and Land Authority, the Capital City Metro, the Sydney Olympic Park Authority, the Board for Urban Places Queensland, and the Capital City Commission South Australia. She advised both government and industry organizations on urban design and public domain matters. While based in Sydney, she was involved in the Sydney 2000 Olympics for 15 years, assisting both pre- and post-event. She currently consults and assists with the Brisbane 2032 Olympics.

In 2011, Bull chaired and co-authored a OECD Global Science Forum report on urban systems modelling to address climate change and sustainability challenges.

As an academic, Bull has authored two books on landscape architecture and urban design, and over 50 journal articles, and cited in hundreds others. As an architect, Bull founded and currently directs her own design firm, while also consulting with EBC Groups in Australia and Hong Kong.

== Awards ==
- Order of Australia (2009) – in recognition of her contribution to landscape architecture and urban design.

== Bibliography ==
- Bull, Catherin Jane (1992-04-11). "Sustainable Tourism in Remote Australia: Strategies for Physical Planning and Infrastructure". Dissertation. 52 (4): 1542–1543. ISSN 0419-4209.
- Bull, Catherin (1997). "City: Repository of dreams – realm of illusion – experience of reality". Urban Design International. 2 (3): 145–153 – via Taylor & Francis.
- Bull, Catherin Jane (2002). New Conversations with an Old Landscape: Landscape Architecture in Contemporary Australia. Images. ISBN 9781876907655.
- Bull, Catherin Jane, ed. (2007). Cross-cultural Urban Design: Global or Local Practice?. Routledge. ISBN 9780415432795.
