= Friedrich Leo von Rottenberger =

Friedrich Leo von Rottenberger (3 September 1872, Třebíč – 27 March 1938, Vienna) was an Austrian gardener and landscape architect. He was born in Trebitsch, Moravia, Austria-Hungary (now Třebíč, Czech Republic).

Son of a judge in Moravia, after completing his gimnazial studies, Rottenberger started working as gardener and landscape architect for the parks of various Moravian estates. In 1892 he was hired by the administration of the park of Schönbrunn Palace, the main summer residence of the Habsburg rulers, first as chief of the park chancellery, then as chief of the castle's park, and finally as administrator of the Imperial Gardens at Schönbrunn Palace.

After the establishment of the Austrian republic, Rottenberger was appointed federal gardener. In this capacity he was in charge of the reconstruction of the Schönbrunn Imperial Gardens, which had been destroyed after the end of World War I. He also organized a commerce of seeds and plants which improved the financial situation of the park's administration. The botanical collection of Schönbrunn became the second largest in Europe.

In 1922 Rottenberg was the first recipient of the Golden Hügelmedall. From 1923 to 1934 he was President of the Österreichische Gartenbaugesellschaft. He was also coeditor of the Austrian magazine Gartenzeitung.

Rottenberger died in Vienna, Austria, aged 65.
