= Dr. Luke A. Port House =

Historic house in Oregon, United States

- Deepwood Museum & Gardens
- U.S. National Register of Historic Places
- U.S. Historic district – Contributing property
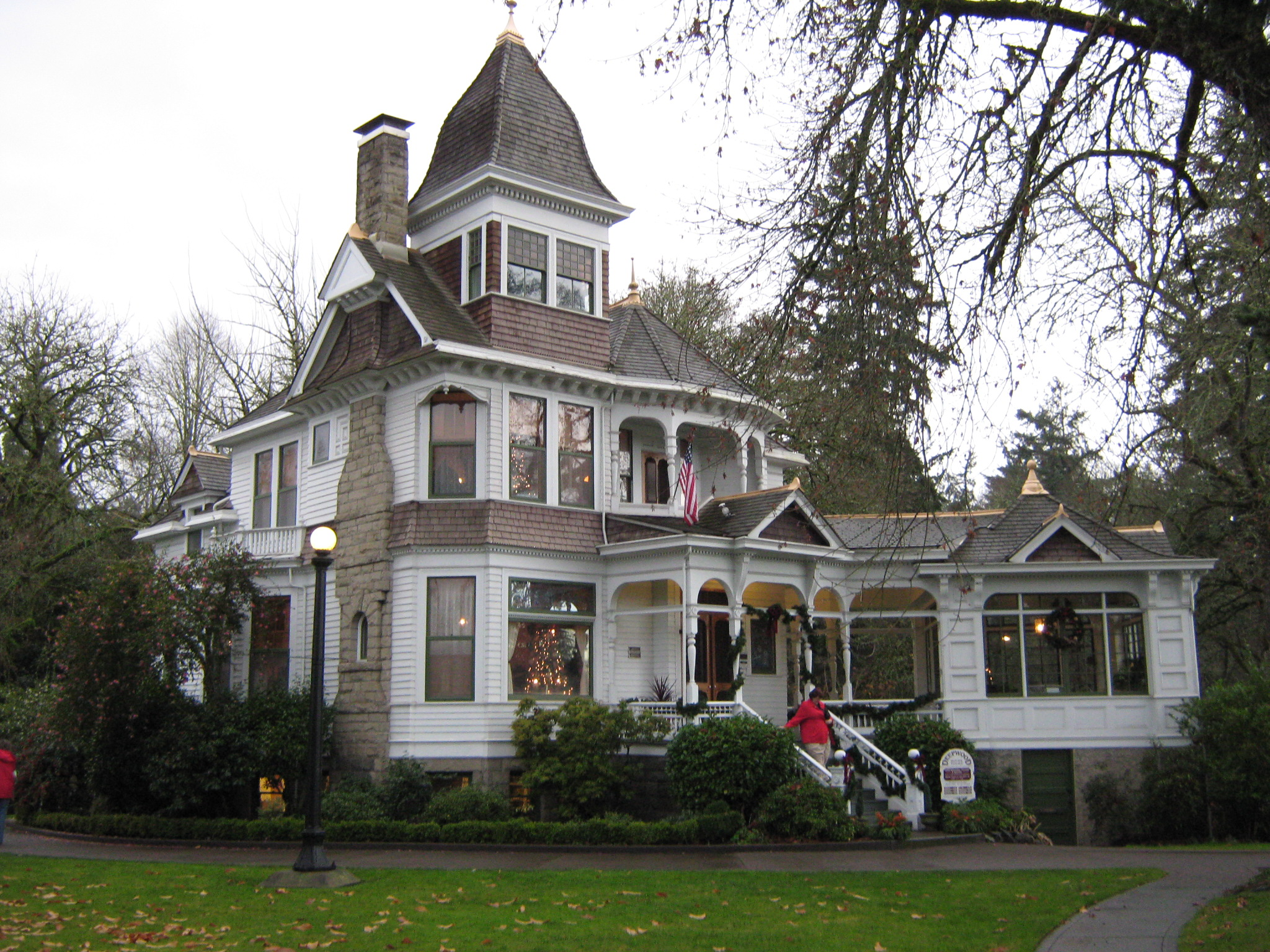
- Location: 1116 Mission Street, SE; Salem, Oregon
- Coordinates: 44°55′48″N 123°01′54″W
- Area: 4 acres (1.6 ha)
- Built: 1894
- Architect: William C. Knighton; Lord & Schryver
- Architectural style: Queen Anne
- Part of: Gaiety Hill – Bush's Pasture Park Historic District (ID86002849)
- NRHP reference No.: 73001581
- Added to NRHP: October 2, 1973

Deepwood Museum & Gardens, formerly known as Historic Deepwood Estate, or simply Deepwood, is a historic house in Salem, Oregon, United States. The home was built by Dr. Luke A. Port, with construction beginning in 1893, and completed in 1894. The historic house and property have been managed since 1974 by the non-profit Friends of Deepwood, and is owned by the City of Salem.

It was designed by William C. Knighton as his first residential commission, and the landscape design was done by the Salem firm of Lord & Schryver starting in 1929. The Queen Anne style house contains Povey Brothers Studio stained glass windows throughout. The construction cost was between $12,000 and $15,000.

== Port Family (1894–1895) ==
Dr. Port was born in Sussex, England, but was raised in Ohio. He served in the Ohio Infantry during the Civil War. A speculator, his business dealings were listed as "undercover" by Dun & Bradstreet in 1867. After settling near San Diego, Port moved his family to Salem in 1884 and opened the drugstore, Port and Son Drugs. His son, Omega, drowned in 1887.

After completion of his new house, Dr. Port sold the home in 1895 to Judge George G. Bingham.

== Bingham Family (1895–1924) ==
George G. Bingham moved into the home with his wife, Willie E. Harris, and young daughter Alice Bingham (Powell). The family would live in the home for almost 30 years, before George & Willie passed within a few weeks of each other.

While living at 1116 Mission, the Bingham's enjoyed entertaining in their home. George was also an extensive gardener, maintaining a small orchard, large vegetable garden, and some livestock on their 4+ acre property on the south side of Salem.

Alice Bingham, married to Keith Powell, inherited the home after the passing of her parents. She sold it to another Willamette Valley couple, Clifford Brown & Alice Bretherton Brown.

== Brown-Powell Family (1924–1968) ==
The Browns spent a year completing numerous renovations on the Victorian home before moving in with their two sons, Werner & Chandler. Sadly, Clifford Brown passed in 1927 in a boating accident in British Columbia, leaving his widow in the house.

Alice Brown would be the longest resident of Deepwood. In 1929, she commissioned Elizabeth Lord and Edith Schryver's firm Lord & Schryver to install the English-style gardens that the property is known for today. She is credited with naming the property Deepwood.

In 1945, she remarried to Keith Powell, widower of Alice Bingham Powell. They were married in the gardens of Deepwood, and would continue to live in the home until 1968, when they decided to move to a smaller home nearby.

== Efforts to Save Deepwood (1968–1971) ==
Largely through a strong community-lead movement, Deepwood was saved from possible demolition. The home had been put up for sale, with strong commercial interest in the property, located just south of downtown Salem.

== City of Salem and the Friends of Deepwood (1971–Present) ==
The City of Salem acquired the house in December 1971. The house and gardens are operated by the non-profit Friends of Deepwood, founded in 1974 as a house museum, public garden, and event venue. The gardens and property are maintained by the City of Salem and two other non-profits, the Deepwood Gardeners and the Lord & Schryver Conservancy.
