= Frances McLeod Blue =

Canadian landscape architect (1914-1992)

Frances McLeod Blue (1914–1992) was a Canadian landscape architect. She designed gardens and landscapes in the United States and Canada, as well as ran a ferme ornée property in Aurora, Canada for many years. She is known for her 50-year history with the Canadian Society for Landscape Architects, serving multiple roles in the society from 1938 until her death in 1992.

== Biography ==
Frances McLeod was born in Toronto, Canada in 1914 and educated at Havergal College, a private girls school. Frances met Lorrie Dunington-Grubb, an English garden designer who had moved to Toronto, at a young age and Grubb introduced her to the budding field of landscape architecture. Frances received private lessons from Grubb and then, in 1933, enrolled in the Lowthorpe School of Landscape Architecture in Groton, Massachusetts. Frances’ father did not approve of her decision to pursue an independent career, but money left by her grandmother allowed her to fund her own education. She graduated from Lowthorpe in 1937, making her one of the earliest female Canadian landscape architects.

Frances moved back to Toronto sometime around 1940-1941 and met her husband, Richard Blue. Frances and Richard had two children, a son and a daughter, and relocated to Aurora, Ontario in 1947, where they purchased a farm. Frances designed the farm in the ferme ornée style and they called the property “Quaker’s Lundy Farms."

== Landscape architecture ==
Frances McLeod Blue took on her first landscape projects in Groton, Massachusetts after graduating from the Lowthorpe School in 1937. During this time, she worked in the office of Laura McTavish, another landscape architect and graduate of the Lowthorpe School. She briefly operated a practice and worked in plant nurseries in Rochester, New York around 1937–1938. In 1939–1940, Frances worked with Edith Henderson on projects in Atlanta, Georgia. She became an associate of the Canadian Society for Landscape Architects in 1938 and held many different roles within the society for the next 50 years. Her papers, including records of her projects, are held at the University of Guelph McLaughlin Library Archival and Special Collections. She kept clippings, ephemera, and a file card index on other Canadian landscape architects throughout her life and wrote a manuscript on the history of the Canadian Society for Landscape Architects.
