= Millennium Library =

A Millennium Library may be:

- Millennium Library (Winnipeg)
- Millennium Library, the library at The Forum, Norwich
- A library designation given by the White House Millennium Council
