= Lowthorpe School of Landscape Architecture =

Former architecture school for women in Groton, Massachusetts

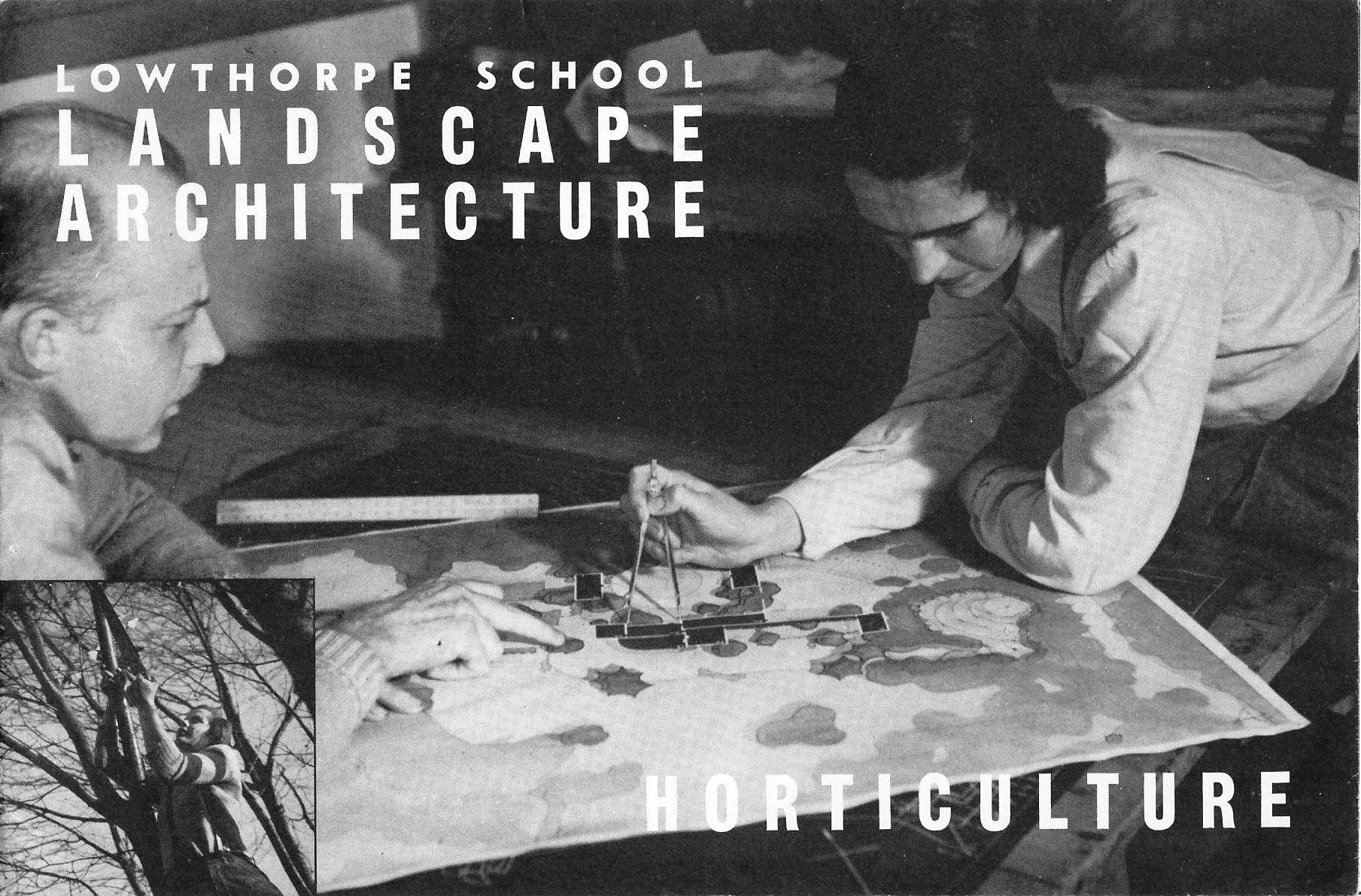
Lowthorpe School: cover of early 1920s brochure

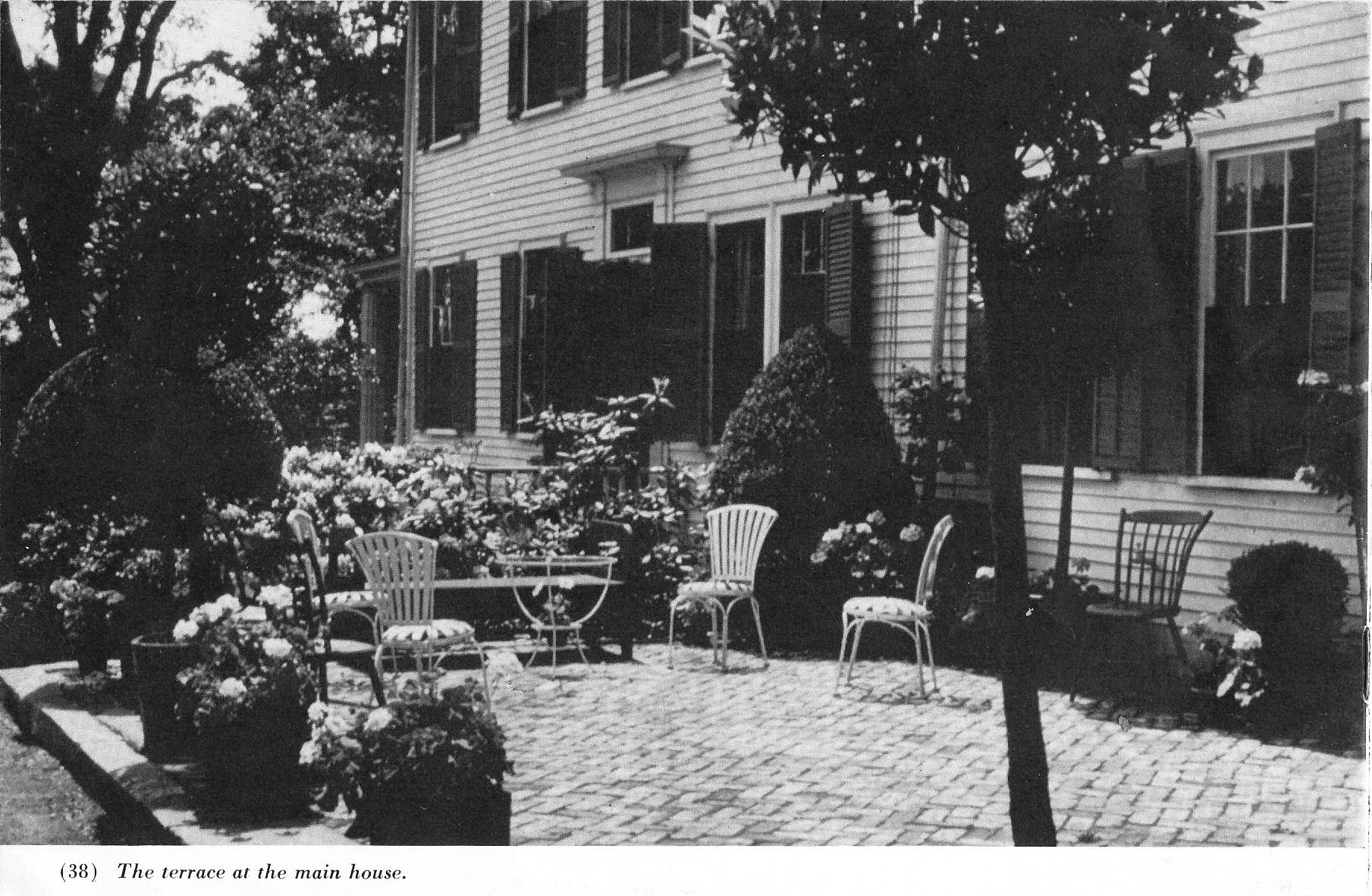
Lowthorpe School main building in the 1920s

A 1929 student diploma.

The Lowthorpe School of Landscape Architecture is the shorthand name for a school that was founded in Groton, Massachusetts in 1901 for women to be trained in landscape architecture and horticulture. Under its original name of Lowthorpe School of Landscape Architecture, Gardening, and Horticulture for Women, the college was one of the first in the world to open the profession to women. In 1915 it was renamed the Lowthorpe School of Landscape Architecture for Women, and in 1945 it was absorbed into the Rhode Island School of Design as the Lowthorpe Department of Landscape Architecture.

== History ==
The school was founded in 1901 as Lowthorpe School of Landscape Architecture, Gardening, and Horticulture for Women by Judith Eleanor Motley Low, a Groton native who was either the granddaughter or great-granddaughter of Benjamin Bussey. Low had spent time in her youth at the Bussey Institute at Arnold Arboretum, studying agriculture, gardening, and botany. A one-page brochure announcing the establishment of the school offered instruction in the subjects of "landscape gardening, elementary architecture, horticulture, botany and allied subjects." The brochure announced an October 1901 start date, but instruction did not actually begin until the following fall.

To be admitted, a prospective student was required to have a high school diploma and some knowledge of both drawing and botany. The school's population of students ranged from single digits in the early years up to 30 or 40 in the 1930s. Instruction focused on private residential design rather than public gardens, as such work was at the time considered most suitable for women.

The Groton campus included 17 acres (69,000 m^{2}) of meadows, orchards, gardens, greenhouses, and an administration building. The gardens were largely the work of school students and were mostly laid out in geometrical arrangements; the herb garden, for example, was in the form of an Elizabethan knot. Although the naturalistic style of Edwardian-era English garden design (embracing both the English landscape garden and its later variant the cottage garden) was the prevailing aesthetic taught at the school, the more formal style of Italian landscape design was also taught and influenced how the gardens were organized.

Lowthorpe was incorporated in 1909 and placed under direction of a board of directors with Low as president of the board. Patrons included Charles W. Eliot, President Emeritus of Harvard University, Professor Charles Sprague Sargent of the Arnold Arboretum and Professor James Sturgis Pray, Chairman of the Department of Landscape Architecture at Harvard, among others. The course curriculum was changed in 1915 from two to three years, diplomas were awarded, and the name changed to the Lowthorpe School of Landscape Architecture for Women, dropping the words Gardening and Horticulture from the title. In 1917, Lowthorpe fielded a baseball team called the Farmerettes.

Under John Parker, Lowthorpe's director from 1934 to 1945, winter classes were taught in Boston at 491 Boylston Street. In 1945, Lowthorpe was absorbed into the Rhode Island School of Design and became known as the Lowthorpe Department of Landscape Architecture.

The stature of the school was raised when Ellen Shipman (named in 1933 by the magazine House & Garden as the "dean of women landscape architects"), in a 40-year career, reportedly would only hire graduates from Lowthorpe School. According to Catharine Filene, writing in Careers for Women in 1920, schools offering training similar to Lowthorpe included Cornell University, the University of Illinois, the Cambridge School of Architecture and Landscape Architecture, and the University of California.

After moving to Rhode Island, the Groton campus was sold to the Catholic Archdiocese of Boston, who in turn sold it to the Holy Union Sisters. The sisters established a convent on the site in 1946 and a day school known the Country Day School of the Holy Union in 1949. Country Day School closed in June, 2017, and the neighboring Lawrence Academy acquired the property in April, 2018.

== Notable faculty and administrators ==
- Josef Albers
- Nellie B. Allen
- Mabel Keyes Babcock
- Amy L. Cogswell (principal, 1916-1924)
- Henry Atherton Frost
- Elizabeth Greenleaf Pattee
- Bremer Whidden Pond (director)
- Robert Sturtevant (faculty and director)

== Notable alumni ==
- Amy L. Cogswell (Class of 1916), practiced in Connecticut and designed the garden at Webb-Deane-Stevens House, a historic house museum in Wethersfield, Connecticut.
- Edith Henderson (1911-2005, Class of 1934), practiced in Atlanta for over 60 years. Designed the landscaping for Techwood and Clark Howell Homes, the first public housing projects in the United States.
- Gertrude Kuh (Class of 1917) practiced many years in the Chicago area
- Elizabeth Blodget Lord (Class of 1929) and Edith Schryver (Class of 1923) formed the Oregon firm of Lord & Schryver
- Frances McLeod Blue (Class of 1937), practiced in Toronto, Ontario and early member of the Canadian Society of Landscape Architects.
- Doris Katherine Raikes Turnbull (Classes of 1924 and 1927) from England after attending a near-London gardening school and then teaching gardening (and becoming fluent in French) 1921 to 1923 at La Corbière école horticole pour jeunes filles in Estavayer-le-Lac on the east shore of Lake Neuchatel in Switzerland; and after Lowthorpe a landscape architect in Bermuda, Ilaro Court in Barbados, and then marrying and living with the plant pathologist Lawrence Ogilvie near Bristol in England.
- Jane Silverstein Ries (Class of 1932) practiced in Denver for more than 50 years

== See also ==
- Cambridge School of Architecture and Landscape Architecture
