= Mabel Keyes Babcock =

American landscape architect (1862–1931)

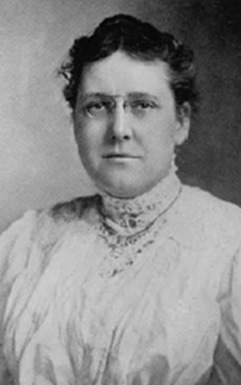
- Born: May 20, 1862; Somerville, Massachusetts, United States
- Died: December 3, 1931 (aged 69); Boston, Massachusetts, United States
- Education: Northwestern University; Massachusetts Institute of Technology

Mabel Keyes Babcock (May 20, 1862 – December 3, 1931) was one of America's early women landscape architects. She taught at Wellesley College and the Lowthorpe School of Landscape Architecture, before going on to become Dean of Women Students at the Massachusetts Institute of Technology.

== Early life and education ==
Born in Somerville, Massachusetts, United States, on May 20, 1862, Mabel Keyes Babcock was the daughter of botanist Henry H. Babcock and Mary Porter (Keyes) Babcock. She was a descendant of William Bradford, the governor of Plymouth Colony. Both of her parents were involved in education: Henry was for a time the principal of Somerville High School in Massachusetts, while Mary, after Henry died, became the headmistress of Kenilworth Hall, a girls' school in the Chicago area.

Babcock earned her undergraduate degree from Northwestern University in 1889. Twenty years later, she resumed her education at the Massachusetts Institute of Technology (MIT), from which she received a B.S. degree in 1908 followed by an M.S. in architecture in 1909. MIT was said to be the only institution offering this qualification to women at that time. At MIT, she had studied with Guy Lowell.

== Career ==
From 1910 to 1914, Babcock taught horticulture and landscape architecture at Wellesley College while also maintaining a solo landscape architecture practice. She spent World War I as a conservation instructor and director of agricultural courses at the recently founded Lowthorpe School of Landscape Architecture in Massachusetts. During the war, she also served on the central committee of the MIT War Service Auxiliary. She went on to serve as the president of the MIT Women's Association from 1916 to 1920, an appointment that eventually led to her taking up the post of Dean of Women Students at MIT.

As a landscape architect, Babcock may be best known for her landscaping of the Arlington Street Church and her design of the MIT President's Garden and Great Court (now Killian Court), where her work expanded on that of Elizabeth Greenleaf Pattee. Babcock planned a French-style gravel-covered court centered on a large statue of Minerva. However, when increasing traffic along Massachusetts Avenune shifted the campus's de facto entrance, the great-court design was replaced with streetside plantings of privet, oak and maple trees, and other plantings that would create a transition from the busy streets surrounding the campus to a quieter oasis within. MIT had only moved to its current location in 1916, and Babcock went on to become involved in the landscape design of the entire campus.

Babcock served as a technical adviser on the landscape program at Bates College in Maine and designed several areas of the campus. She also did landscape design for a number of private clients in Maine. It is possible that she may have been involved in landscaping the campus of Wellesley College.

She was a member of the American Society of Landscape Architects and the Boston Society of Landscape Architects. She was also a member of President Herbert Hoover's Conference on Home Building and Home Ownership.

Babcock died in Boston on December 3, 1931, aged 69.
