= Amy Cogswell =

American landscape architect, horticulturalist, and rosarian (1867–1958)

Amy Lucretia Cogswell (1867–1958) was an American landscape architect, horticulturalist, and rosarian. She was a prominent resident of Norwich, Connecticut, designed several regional gardens, won horticultural prizes, and lectured locally on gardening for amateurs.

== Biography ==
Amy L. Cogswell was born in Norwich, Connecticut on June 20, 1867. The Cogswell family had a presence in Norwich since the colonial era. Her parents, Charles Perkins Cogswell and Sarah Lucretia Cogswell, had three children, one of which, Alice Walbridge Cogswell, lived with Amy for most of their adult lives.

Amy attended Norwich Free Academy and graduated as valedictorian and first scientific honors in 1885. In 1916, she graduated from the Lowthorpe School of Landscape Architecture for Women, becoming part of a group of some of the earliest professional female landscape architects in the United States. From 1916 to 1923, she served as the headmistress and principal at Lowthorpe School. She died on November 12, 1958, and is buried at Yantic Cemetery.

== Landscape Design ==
While not much is known about Amy Cogswell's life after her time at Lowthorpe School, by the mid-1920s she was considered an expert in gardens and particularly colonial revival gardening. The Connecticut chapter of the National Society of the Colonial Dames of America commissioned Cogswell in 1921 to create a colonial revival garden at the historic Webb House in Wethersfield, Connecticut. This garden design was rediscovered in 1999 and the Webb Deane Stevens Museum restored to garden according to Cogswell's original plan.

The Aspinook Bleachery of Jewett City, Connecticut hired Cogswell to beautify the grounds of their manufacturing plant in 1916. In 1927, Cogswell was hired to restore the flower garden at Monticello. She created a plan using historic materials at the site such as an 18th century Jefferson drawing and a watercolor of the site from 1825, but the Albemarle Garden Club protested her designs. She received a commission for the Glebe House in Woodbury, Connecticut in 1925, a year before Gertrude Jekyll provided a design for the same house that was eventually recreated. Other commissions include Moor's End in Nantucket, Massachusetts and consultation on planting outside the Metropolitan Museum of Art, as well as several private residences in the Hartford area. Many of her commissions were initiated through Fiske Kimball and his contacts in the museum world.

== Horticulturalist ==
Amy Cogswell was active in a Norwich Growers group and the New London Horticulture Society from as early as 1905 and into the 1920s. Due to her education and professional practice, she was often invited to speak to local garden groups in Norwich and New London county. She consistently won awards at regional horticulture shows, usually for her roses. In 1905, she won an hybrid rose award for a "one flower of 12 distinct varieties" at the New London County Horticultural Society Show. In 1912, she won a largest rose bloom prize for a notable 5.5 inch Paul Neyron rose bloom.
