= Gertrude Kuh =

American landscape architect

- Born: Gertrude Eisendrath; September 11, 1893; Racine, Wisconsin, United States
- Died: September 1977 (aged 83–84)
- Other name: Gertrude Deimel; Gertrude Deimel Kuh; Gertrude Eisendrath Kuh
- Education: Lowthorpe School of Landscape Architecture
- Occupation: landscape architect
- Spouse: Jerome Deimel; George Kuh

Gertrude Kuh (1893–1977) was an American landscape architect who worked primarily in the Chicago area.

== Education and personal life ==
Gertrude Eisendrath was born September 11, 1893, in Racine, Wisconsin, to Benjamin David Eisendrath and Frances Eisendrath. Her family moved to Chicago when she was six. She began her college education at Sweet Briar College in Virginia but quickly transferred to the Lowthorpe School of Landscape Architecture in Groton, Massachusetts, from which she graduated in 1917.

After college, Kuh undertook an apprenticeship with the landscape architect Ellen Biddle Shipman in Massachusetts. In 1921, she returned to Chicago.

In 1942, Gertrude married George Kuh, whose ex-wife was Chicago art curator and gallery owner Katharine Kuh. She had been previously married to Jerome Deimel; who died in 1926. She had a son, John (b1926-d2018), with Jerome Deimel.

== Career ==
Over a career spanning some forty years, Kuh designed over 400 landscaping projects and gardens. Although she never took on partners, she had two associates, Mary Long Rogers and Edith Antognoli.

Little is known about her early work (prior to 1950) since Kuh discarded most of the records of these projects. Between 1950 and her retirement in the 1970s, Kuh designed some 250 landscaping projects about which somewhat more is known, mostly for private residences in and around Chicago, Lake Forest, Winnetka, Glencoe, and Highland Park, Illinois. She worked on both plantings for new construction and redesigns of existing landscaping. She was designing in an era when many large estates were being broken up into smaller parcels, and she became known for her skill at helping these small plots maintain a sense of spaciousness and privacy through such techniques as clustering trees and shrubs, planting trees with strong sculptural lines that signaled grandeur, and using color schemes that skewed towards green.

Kuh died in September 1977. Her papers are held by the Art Institute of Chicago and include letters from Shipman and an oral interview with Kuh's son John (tape no longer exists). In November 1997, the Art Institute of Chicago mounted "The Modern Midwestern Landscape," an exhibition featuring her work and that of fellow landscape architect Franz Lipp.
