= Jane Silverstein Ries =

American landscape architect

- Born: Julia Jane Silverstein; March 10, 1909; Denver, Colorado
- Died: July 6, 2005 (aged 96)
- Education: Lowthorpe School of Landscape Architecture
- Occupation: Architect
- Spouse: Henry F. Ries
- Awards: Fellow American Society of Landscape Architects Colorado Women’s Hall of Fame
- Practice: McCrary, Culley and Carhart; Jane Silverstein Ries

Jane Silverstein Ries (1909–2005), also known professionally as Julia Jane Silverstein, was an American landscape architect who was the first woman licensed in Colorado as a professional landscape architect. For her landscape work as well as her efforts to preserve and restore historical sites, she was inducted into the Colorado Women's Hall of Fame and a foundation was established in her name that awards scholarships in her field and supports an annual lecture series.

== Education and personal life ==
Julia Jane Silverstein was born on March 10, 1909, in Denver, Colorado, to Harry S. and Eva W. (Sickman) Silverstein. She attended public school and received her training in landscape architecture at the Lowthorpe School of Landscape Architecture, from which she graduated in 1932. She went on do further studies at the University of Colorado, the University of Denver, and at the Rhode Island School of Design.

She worked under her birth name for the first few years of her professional career. In 1953, she married Henry F. Ries, a Colorado insurance actuary; and starting in 1961, she used Jane Silverstein Ries as her professional name. Henry died in 1984.

== Career ==
Silverstein began her professional career in 1933 when she was hired by the Denver-based landscape architecture firm of McCrary, Culley and Carhart to work on planting designs for Colorado University. In 1935, she opened her own firm in Denver, specializing in residential landscape design for smaller lots. Silverstein also received commissions to design plantings for other kinds of sites, including housing projects, large estates, churches, schools, hospitals, government buildings, and businesses. She is responsible for the Herb and Scripture Gardens at the Denver Botanic Gardens.

Silverstein gained a reputation for plantings that diverged from the most common planting plan in Denver of front and back lawn plus foundation plantings and a flowering border. Inspired by the walled gardens of Boston's Beacon Hill, which she had admired during her Lowthorpe years, she designed gardens that were slightly formal yet intimate, and that often featured native plants that did not require great amounts of water. Her career took off after she designed a garden in 1935 for a General Electric demonstration project, and altogether she designed over 1500 gardens in her long career.

During World War II, Silverstein served in New York in the Women's Reserve of the U.S. Coast Guard as an officer working on matters to do with port liaison and property surveys. She ended the war with the rank of lieutenant. After the war, Silverstein briefly held a job as a landscape architect for the New York firm of Skidmore, Owings & Merrill before returning to Denver in 1947 and reopening her own practice.

Ries was active in working to preserve elements of Colorado's urban past. She was a key mover in a drive to rehabilitate the grounds of Colorado Governor's Mansion, and she also consulted on the Molly Brown House Museum garden and the 9th Street Historic Park. She also developed an early set of plans for the Larimer Square redevelopment.

In the 1960s, Ries worked to establish a Colorado licensing authority for landscape architects. After the state's Landscape Architect Registration Act passed, Ries became (in 1968) the third person and the first woman to be certified as a licensed landscape architect in Colorado.

In 1965, Ries was elected a fellow of the American Society of Landscape Architects (ASLA). She was also a member of the ASLA's Rocky Mountain Chapter (now the Colorado Chapter) and became its first president. She was given the Community Service Award by the American Institute of Architects' Denver Chapter. In 1990, she was inducted into the Colorado Women's Hall of Fame.

Ries never formally retired, but in 1989 she became a senior adviser to the firm Land Mark Design, which had been founded by former colleagues and associates.

Ries died on July 6, 2005. Earlier that same year, she had been honored with the prestigious American Society of Landscape Architects Medal in recognition of her lifetime of achievements in her profession.

== Legacy ==
In 1992, 737 Franklin Street, where Ries lived and kept an office for many decades, was designated a Denver landmark.

In 1983, the ASLA's Colorado Chapter established the Jane Silverstein Ries Award to honor members showing exceptional awareness of the importance of land stewardship in the Rocky Mountains. The Colorado Chapter also established the JSR Foundation (in 1997), which awards scholarships to landscape architecture students, funds an annual lecture series, and administers the Jane Silverstein Ries Award. Ries herself inaugurated the foundation's lecture program.

A hardy boxwood cultivar, Buxus mycrophylla “Julia Jane”, is named after her.

Her papers—comprising photographs, landscape design drawings, business documents, client files, and letters—are held by the Denver Public Library.
