= Cliff Eyland =

Canadian painter, writer, and curator (1954–2020)

- Born: November 7, 1954; Halifax, Nova Scotia
- Died: May 16, 2020 (aged 65)
- Known for: painter, writer and curator

Cliff Eyland (November 7, 1954 – May 16, 2020) was a Canadian painter, writer and curator.

== Career ==
Born in Halifax and raised in Dartmouth, Nova Scotia, Eyland studied art at Holland College, Mount Allison University, and the Nova Scotia College of Art and Design. While in school, he was influenced by artists Robert Morris, On Kawara and Daniel Buren.

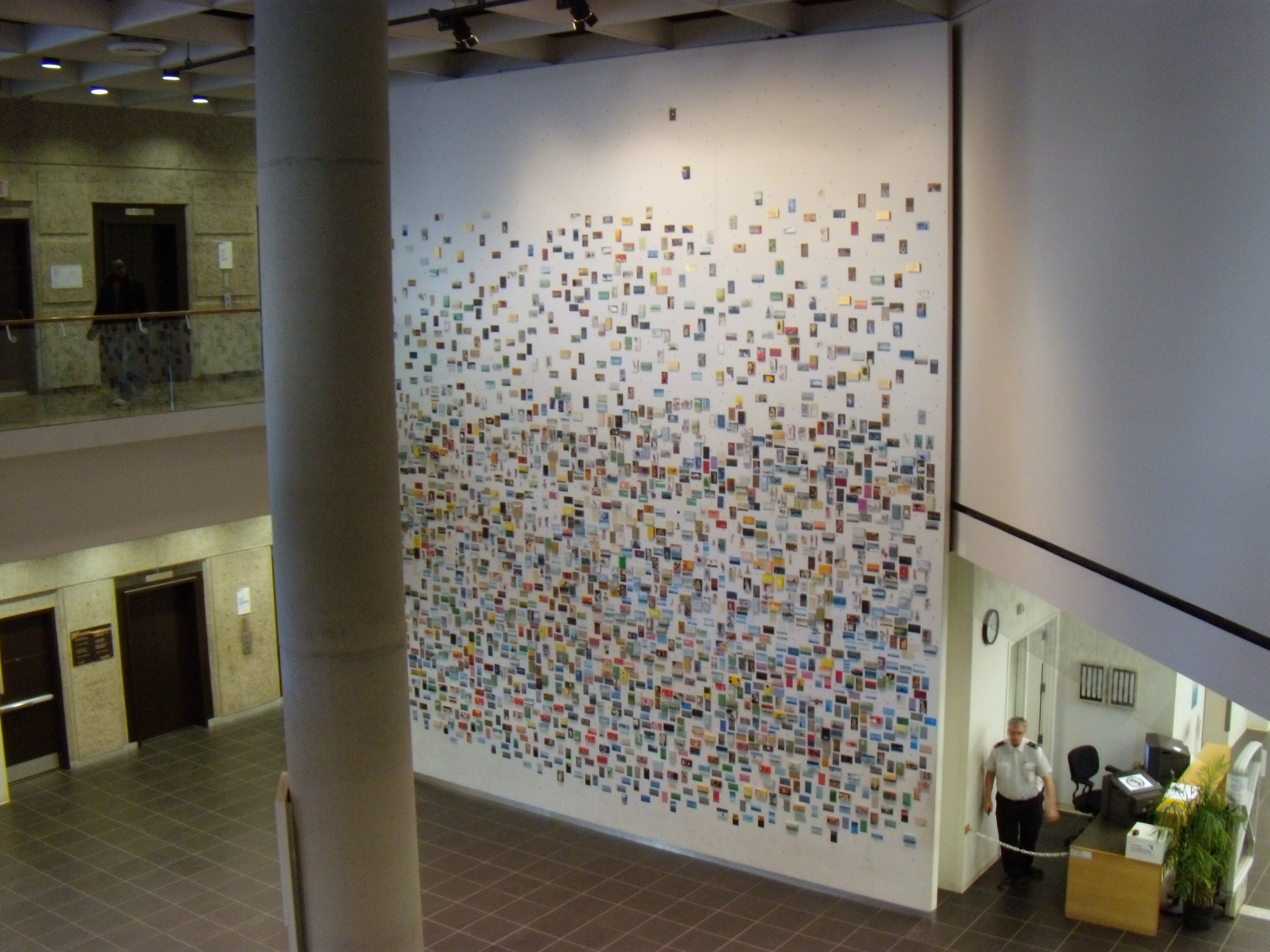
Cliff Eyland's Untitled, in the lobby of Millennium Library in Winnipeg Manitoba

Eyland was best known for his work that transformed public spaces and his drawings and paintings done on the small 3 x 5 index card format. In 2005 his installation Untitled, consisting of over 1000 paintings, opened at the Winnipeg's Millennium Library. In 2014, he installed at the Halifax Central Library whereLibrary Cards is behind the front desk and Book Shelf Paintings is on the fifth floor. He also has a smaller public art commission of 600 painting titled Sculptures in Landscapes at the Meadows branch of the Edmonton Public Library.

Eyland also hid card drawings in books and card catalogues at the Art Gallery of Ontario in Toronto, the Library and Archives in Ottawa and the Muttart Library in Calgary. During his 2012 residency and solo exhibition at the National Gallery of Canada, he showed painting in the vitrine, published an artist book and placed 1000 file card drawings into books in the Library.

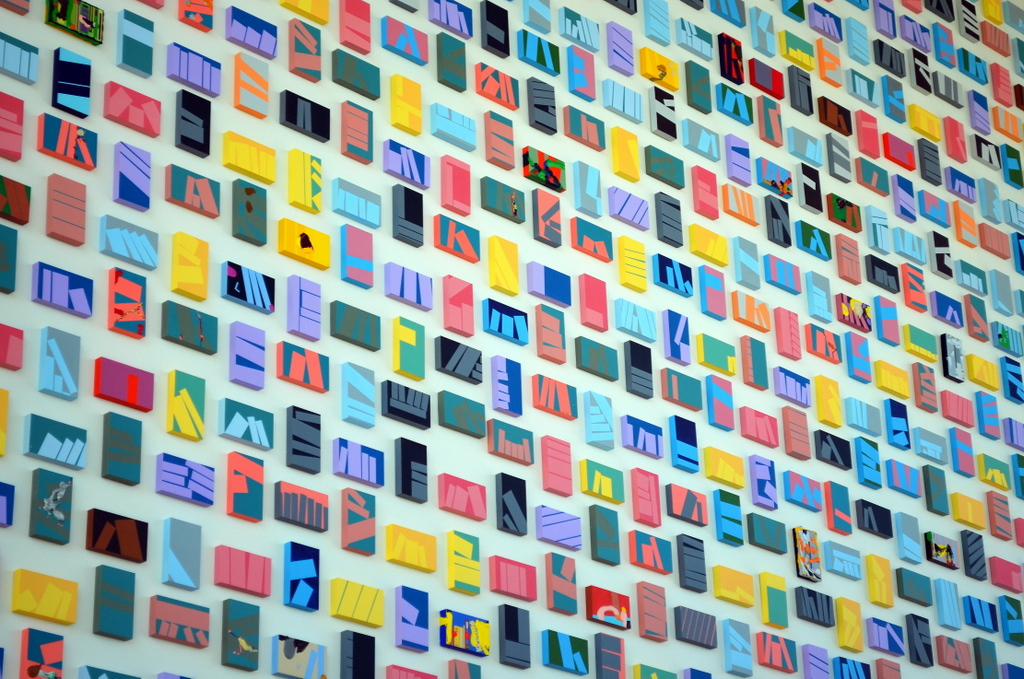
A portion of Eyland's installation called Book Shelf Paintings (2014) at the Halifax Central Library,

Eyland was a curator and writer as an extension of his artistic practice. Between 1998–2010, he was an associate professor of painting at the University of Manitoba School of Art and director of Gallery One One One.

Eyland's archives are held at the University of Manitoba Archives & Special Collections. In 2020, his alma mater Nova Scotia College of Art and Design set up the Cliff Eyland Memorial Scholarship for painting students and endowed by his family.

In 2022 he was the subject of Cliff: A Portrait of an Artist, a mid-length documentary film by Adam Brooks.

== Exhibitions ==
Exhibition highlights include solo exhibitions at the New School University in New York City, the Winnipeg Art Gallery, Struts Gallery and Gallery Connexion (both in New Brunswick), the Muttart (now the Art Gallery of Calgary), the Art Gallery of Southwestern Manitoba, and at the Art Gallery of Nova Scotia, the Eyelevel Gallery, Saint Mary's University Art Gallery and Dalhousie University Art Gallery.

Group exhibitions include shows in Paris at the Maison Rouge museum, in Florence, Italy, Manchester, England, and Lublin, Poland, among others. Eyland regularly updated his ongoing installation File Card Works Hidden in Books at the Raymond Fogelman Library at the New School University in New York City between 1997 until 2005.
