= Nellie B. Allen =

American landscape architect

- Born: Nellie Beatrice Osborn; October 23, 1874; Cameron, Missouri
- Died: December 25, 1961 (aged 87)
- Education: Lowthorpe School of Landscape Architecture
- Occupation: Architect
- Practice: Nellie B. Allen

Nellie Beatrice Osborn Allen (1874–1961) was an American landscape architect. She is known for her knot gardens.

== Early life and education ==
Allen was born on October 23, 1874, in Cameron, Missouri, to David and Pauline Osborn, who were originally from Virginia. Her father was a farmer, and she was the fourth of five children, with one brother and three sisters.

Prior to 1900 she married Sidney P. Allen, founder of the Louisiana Land and Exploration Company. By 1916, she had raised a daughter, divorced her husband, and decided to enter the field of landscape architecture.

In 1916, under the name Beatrice Osborn Allen, she enrolled at the Lowthorpe School of Landscape Architecture for Women. She remained there for three years, and her thesis project at Lowthorpe included a knot garden, which would later become her specialty. After graduating in 1919, she traveled in Europe, to which she would return periodically throughout her life.

== Career ==
Allen set up her own practice in New York City in the 1920s, using Nellie B. Allen as her professional name and specializing in residential landscape design. Due partly to her late start in her field, her practice remained regional, almost entirely located in New York and New England.

Allen's landscape designs were influenced by the work of Gertrude Jekyll, whom she met in 1921 on her European travels and whom she would later visit again at Munstead Wood. She featured perennials in her plantings, creating English-style perennial borders and designs featuring topiary work. Allen became best known for geometric gardens, especially her knot gardens, the designs for which were influenced by knot gardens she had seen during her European travels. She designed a parterre garden for the 1939 New York World's Fair, with Constance Boardman, the Bishop's Garden at Washington Cathedral, and for several private residences. Her clients included Helen Thorne (the wife of Oakleigh Thorne) and Anne Vanderbilt.

Allen gave public lectures on garden design and New England history. She was a member-at-large of the Garden Club of America and occasionally wrote articles for the club's bulletin as well as for gardening magazines.

Although Allen's gardens were often featured in gardening magazines like House Beautiful and Country Life in America, none of them survive in their original form.

Allen died on December 25, 1961. In the Carl A. Kroch Library, Cornell University holds a small collection of photographs and plans of her work.
