= Edith Schryver =

Edith Eleanor Schryver (1901–1984) was a founding partner of Lord & Schryver, the first female owned and operated landscape architecture firm in the Pacific Northwest from 1929 to 1969.

== Early years ==
Edith Schryver was born on March 20, 1901, in Kingston, New York. She grew up in an apartment over the Kingston railroad station where her father, George Schryver, managed the restaurant and her mother Eleanor Young was a homemaker. In 1903, her brother Harry Schryver was born.

After high school, she attended the Pratt Institute in Brooklyn, New York to study watercolor. In 1920 she transferred to the Lowthorpe School of Landscape Architecture for Women in Groton, Massachusetts. The coursework there was intensive and lasted three years. It included architectural drafting, freehand and perspective drawing, construction, surveying, site engineering, history of architecture and landscape architecture, soils, plant materials, elementary forestry, botany, and entomology. While at Lowthorpe, she worked part-time with local, well-established landscape architects Elizabeth Leonard Strang, Harold Hill Blossom, and Elizabeth Greenleaf Pattee.

Schryver performed well in her Lowthorpe courses and her work was highly regarded. In 1922, she received a summer internship with notable New York landscape architect, Ellen Biddle Shipman, in Cornish, New Hampshire. Upon graduation in 1922, Schryver joined Ellen Shipman’s New York firm as a draftsperson, working there for five years. In the Shipman office, Schryver received further training not only as a designer but also in the business of running an office. She corresponded with clients and nurserymen in addition to providing drawings and plans for Shipman’s growing practice. Schryver’s work draws on the design styles of Shipman and Platt, incorporating the Italian villa and English cottage garden influences that would remain evident throughout her career.

Shipman biographer Judith Tankard describes Edith Schryver as an "…excellent draftsman" who worked on many important commissions with Shipman, and as one of the best-known landscape architects in Shipman’s office.

In 1927, Schryver took a sabbatical from Shipman's office to join Lowthorpe's European Travel Course co-sponsored by Harvard's Cambridge School of Domestic and Landscape Architecture for Women, a three-month tour was limited to twenty women interested in landscape design. It introduced participants to the great historic monuments of Europe including country houses, villas, and their associated gardens. Schryver visited and photographed gardens in England, France, Germany, Italy, and Spain. During this journey, she met Elizabeth Lord, 14 years her senior and also enrolled at Lowthorpe.

After the tour, Schryver returned to her position in NYC and Lord returned to Lowthorpe to complete her coursework. Over the next year, Schryver and Lord stayed in contact and discussed plans for establishing their own landscape architecture firm in Salem, Oregon, Lord’s hometown. They arrived in Salem in 1928. "I wanted to change and always wanted see the West Coast, Alaska and Japan so [we] decided that we would form a partnership of landscape architects and so I came out to Oregon with her; we formed a partnership, the first women to practice in the Northwest."

== Professional work ==
Schryver and Lord's Salem, Oregon office was the first on the West Coast to be run entirely by women. From 1929 to 1969, the firm designed over 200 gardens throughout the Pacific Northwest. These included a variety of residential, civic, and public spaces. Schryver's expertise was engineering and construction while Lord focused on plant selection and composition. Among their office archives at the University of Oregon are documents from two dozen projects that Schryver worked on while in Shipman's office.

In 1932, they hired Clarence L. Smith, a prominent Salem architect with whom they would partner in several projects, to build their own house and personal garden on a portion of the original Lord home property. They named the new home Gaiety Hollow for its location near the Gaiety Hill neighborhood. Gaiety Hollow was placed on the National Register of Historic Places in 2014.

During World War II, when commissions decreased, Schryver taught advanced landscape design at Oregon State College. She also lectured at local garden clubs, wrote articles for local and regional publications, and participated in a Corvallis-based radio show called "The Home Garden Hour."

Schryver, know to her friends as "Nina", retired from professional practice and closed the firm in 1969. Upon Lord's death in 1976, Schryver remained in the house they shared for over 40 years. In 1984, when she died, the firm's professional papers were archived at the University of Oregon, home of the only state school of landscape architecture.
