= Halifax Central Library =

Public library in Halifax, Nova Scotia

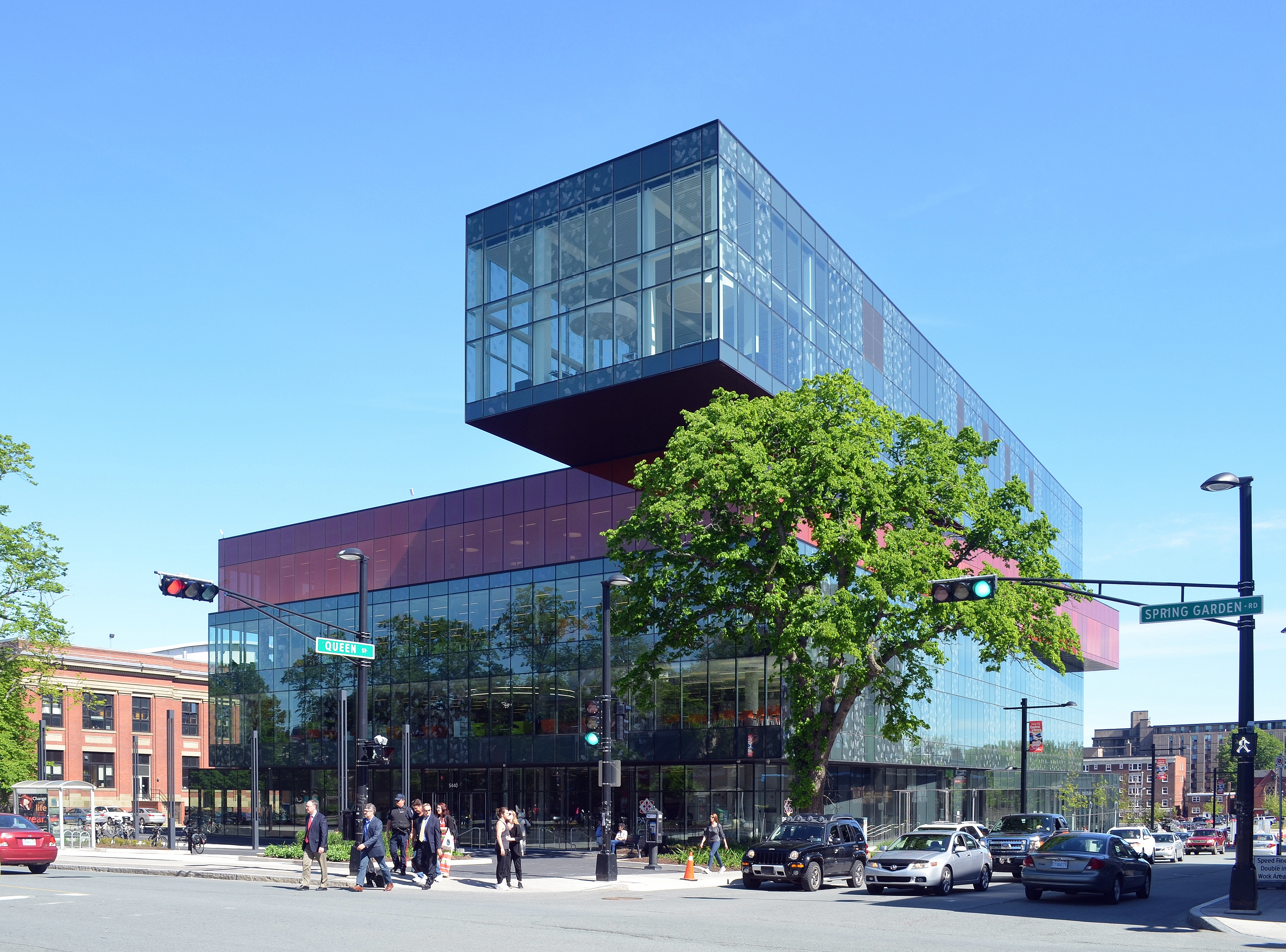
- Interactive map of the Halifax Central Library area

General information
- Type: Public library
- Location: 5440 Spring Garden Road; Halifax, Nova Scotia; B3J 1E9
- Coordinates: 44.6429°N 63.5753°W
- Construction started: 2012
- Opened: 13 December 2014
- Cost: $57.6 million
- Owner: Halifax Public Libraries

Technical details
- Floor count: 5
- Floor area: 11,000 m^{2} (120,000 sq ft)

Design and construction
- Architecture firm: Schmidt Hammer Lassen; Fowler Bauld & Mitchell

Website
- halifaxpubliclibraries.ca

The Halifax Central Library is a public library in Halifax, Nova Scotia, Canada. It is located on the corner of Spring Garden Road and Queen Street in Downtown Halifax. It serves as the flagship library of the Halifax Public Libraries, replacing the Spring Garden Road Memorial Library.

A new central library was discussed by library administrators for several decades and approved by the regional council in 2008. The architects, a joint venture between local firm Fowler Bauld and Mitchell and Schmidt Hammer Lassen of Denmark, were chosen in 2010 through an international design competition. Construction began later that year on a prominent downtown site that had been a parking lot for half a century.

The new library opened in December 2014 and has become a highly popular gathering place. In addition to a book collection significantly larger than that of the former library, the new building houses a wide range of amenities including cafés, an auditorium, and community rooms. The striking architecture is characterised by the fifth floor's cantilever over the entrance plaza, a central atrium criss-crossed by staircases, and the building's transparency and relationship to the urban context.

The library won a Lieutenant Governor's Design Award in Architecture for 2014 and a Governor General's Medal in Architecture in 2016.

== History ==
=== Planning ===
The Spring Garden Road main library, opened in 1951, had been considered inadequate by library administrators for several decades. The first report mentioning a replacement building was published in 1971. An expansion built in 1974 was quickly outgrown. A 1987 assessment noted that the spaces within were "self-contained and inflexible" and that "study space and comfortable reading areas are presently the focus of serious public complaint ... services are cramped and over crowded."

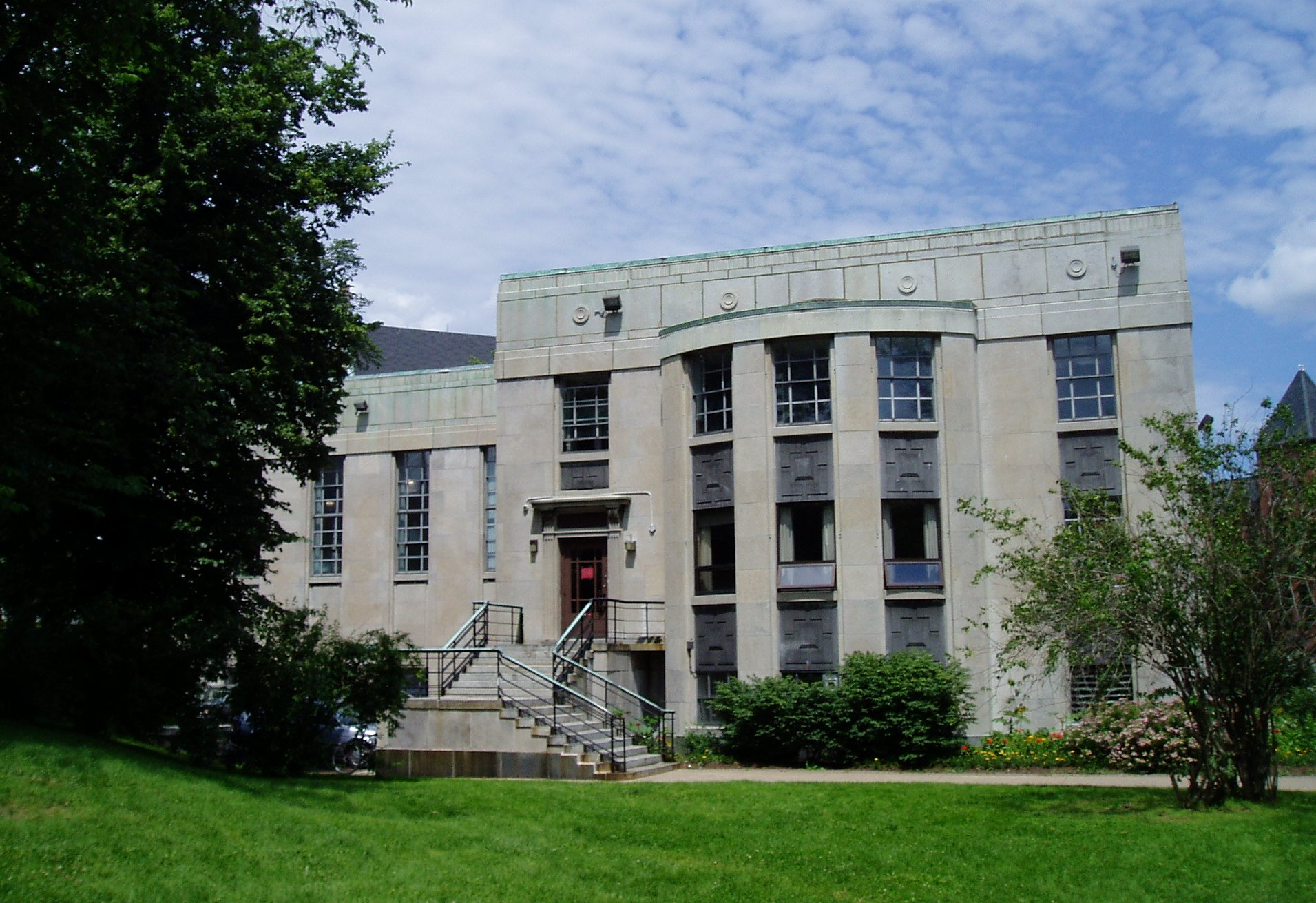
The former Spring Garden Road Memorial Library

In the mid-1990s the municipalities of Halifax, Dartmouth, Bedford, and Halifax County were amalgamated, and a new regional library board was created. In 1995, the Joint Amalgamation Committee of the merged libraries "agreed that a new central library would be needed to serve the new Halifax Regional Library system and that the site should remain in the present downtown area." They cited numerous problems with the original building. In addition to its small size (3,594 square metres [38,690 sq ft]), technological improvements were hampered by poor wiring and difficulty laying cable in mid-floor locations. Accessibility was poor due to the numerous stairs, levels, and an undersized elevator. Other problems with the building included leaks, asbestos, inoperable windows, the lack of a sprinkler system, inadequate climate control, ceilings as low as 1.95 m (6 ft 5 in), and the lack of numerous services found at other modern libraries.

Following the merger, the new library board undertook extensive planning for a new facility in the hope that a new central library might be part of the 1999 commemoration of the 250th anniversary of the city. The library board commissioned an architectural study, released in 1997, recommending a new central library of approximately 8,800 square metres (95,000 sq ft) after concluding a renovation of the existing library would "not result in significant cost savings" and would lead to a less efficient building. Furthermore, it recommended building the new library on a different site in order to avoid costly temporary relocation. This study considered six different sites for the new library and recommended the lot at Queen and Clyde Streets, then a municipal parking lot. The projected cost of construction was just short of $24 million at 1997 prices.

The recommendation for a new library was echoed in a 2004 needs assessment and master plan study for the overall library system. The central library was identified as the "first priority" for the library board in terms of capital development, with implementation recommended by 2009. The study found agreement among survey respondents that the library should be located in downtown Halifax, being the core of the region and an anticipated area of growth in the regional plan.

Following the 2004 demolition of the nearby former Halifax Infirmary, planning and public consultation began, as part of the Spring Garden Road & Queen Street Joint Public Lands Study, in order to determine the future of the glut of vacant public lands in the area. The lot directly on this prime intersection was closely considered as the site of either a new central library or a justice centre, consolidating other courthouse facilities around the city. The site had been occupied by Bellevue House, the army commandant's house from the 19th century until it was demolished in 1955. It had then remained a parking lot into the 21st century. In June 2007, regional council voted to approve "in principle, designation of the property at the corner of Spring Garden Road and Queen Street as the site of the Central Library" and to initiate negotiations for the acquisition of that land from the province. These negotiations, concluded in January 2010, resulted in a land swap: the municipality acquired the Queen and Spring Garden site from the province in exchange for the former Queen Elizabeth High School and Birk's (Barrington and George streets) lands, plus $1.9 million "in recognition of the higher value of the provincially owned land."

On 12 August 2008, regional council voted to approve the library project in principle and direct municipal staff to develop a financial plan for the project. On 28 April 2009, the council passed a motion to advance the library as a project under the Building Canada Fund, a federal fund that financed projects jointly with local governments from 2007 to 2014. This resulted in an $18.3 million contribution from the federal government.

=== Architect selection and public consultations ===
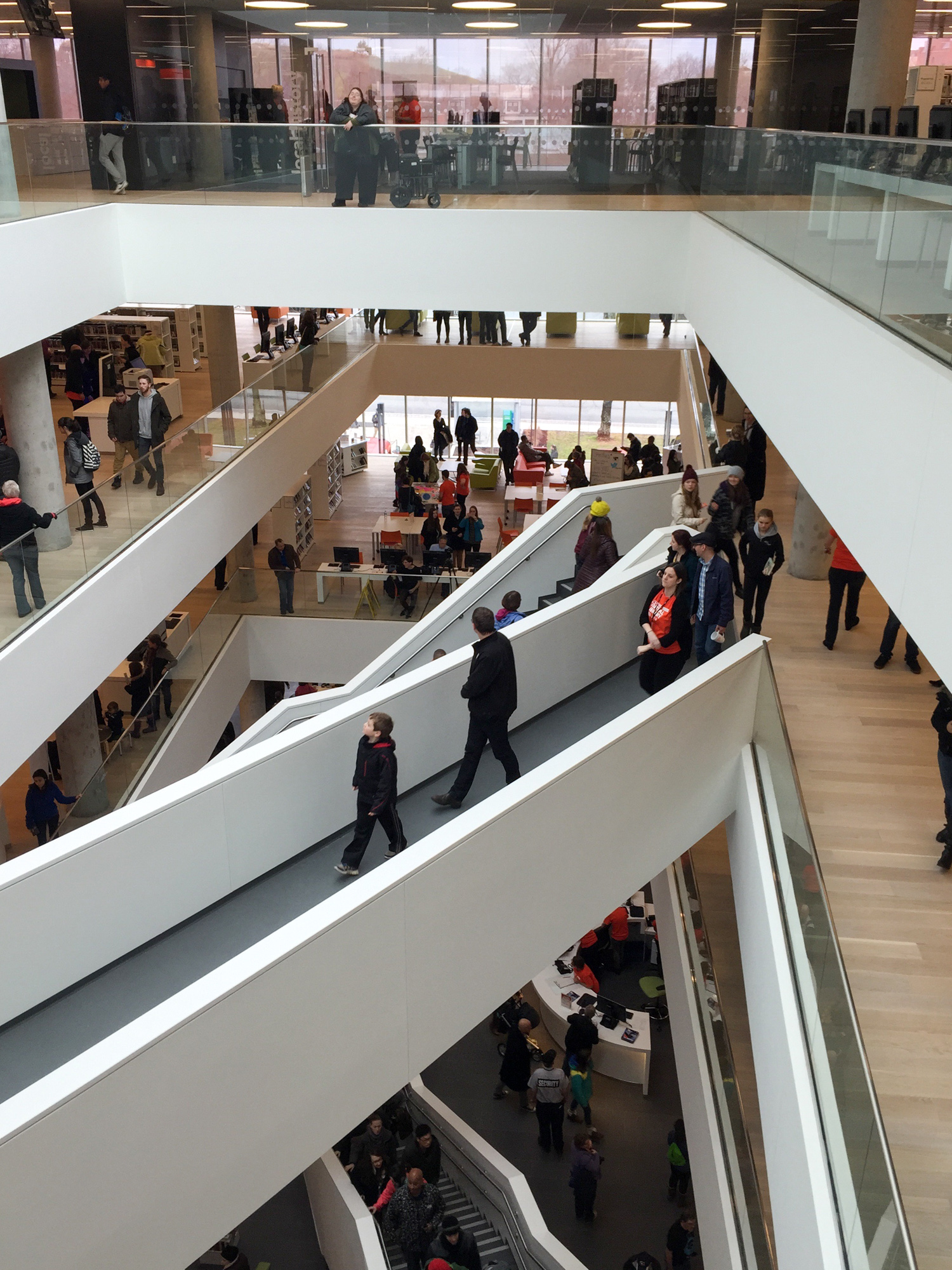
Inside the library looking down from the fourth floor

The architects for the new library were chosen through an international competition for a design contract worth CA$4.3 million. Four architectural teams were shortlisted, each a partnership between a local and a non-local firm. The winning scheme, a joint venture by Danish firm Schmidt Hammer Lassen and Fowler Bauld & Mitchell of Halifax, was selected in March 2010. The other shortlisted teams were Lydon Lynch with HOK, Barrie and Langille with Moriyama and Teshima, and Shore Tilbe Irwin + Partners with John K. Dobbs.

The library governance stated they sought to "involve as many people as possible in the public consultation process for the new central library." It was suggested in The Coast, a weekly newspaper, that this emphasis on public involvement was a reaction to a negative public response toward a proposed redesign of Point Pleasant Park after its partial destruction in Hurricane Juan. Early planning was undertaken in three public consultation phases during 2008. Five more public meetings and workshops were held in 2010 following the selection of the design architects. The final design was unveiled by the architects during the fifth of these meetings on 4 November 2010. A final public event was held at Pier 21 on 14 November 2012.

=== War memorial issue ===
The Spring Garden Road Memorial Library was named after its status as a war memorial and displayed several commemorative artefacts, including two Books of Remembrance containing the names of thousands of Halifax County residents who gave their lives in the First World War, Second World War, and Korean War. A page was turned in each book every Remembrance Day. A Silver Cross was also on display. The building contains a plaque reading, "This building was erected in memory of those who gave their lives in defence of their Country, 1914–1918; 1939–1945. For their Faith, for their Courage, for their Sacrifice, We Will Remember Them."

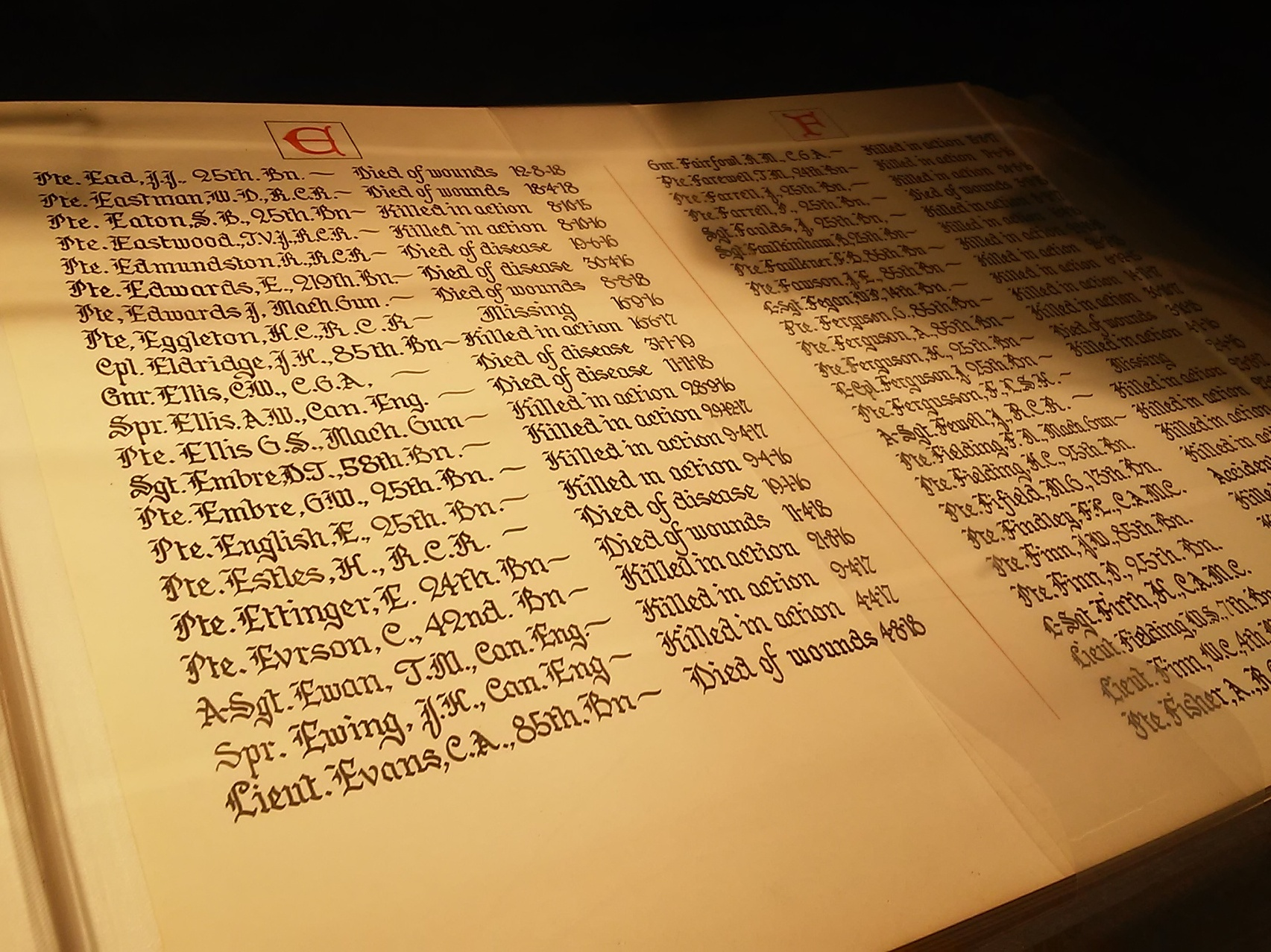
One of the Books of Remembrance on display at the new library

Ahead of the opening of the new library, some residents voiced concern that with the closure of the former building the war memorial will effectively disappear. Local author and historian Blair Beed questioned why the term "memorial" was not carried over to the new building, and proposed that "Halifax Memorial Library" would be a more appropriate name lest wartime sacrifices be pushed aside and forgotten. He also worried about the fate of the historical artefacts on display. Another resident suggested that such concerns were not given serious consideration during the public consultation process.

Library management responded that the war commemoration would be incorporated into the local history section of the library, and that the two remembrance books would be joined by a third recognizing those who died in conflicts following the Korean War. They also stated that a "few elements of the existing wartime display such as the Silver Cross, flags and standards" would be transferred to the Maritime Command Museum at Admiralty House, CFB Halifax. The three Books of Remembrance are now on display in a glass case next to the local history room on the fourth level of the new library.

=== Construction and opening ===
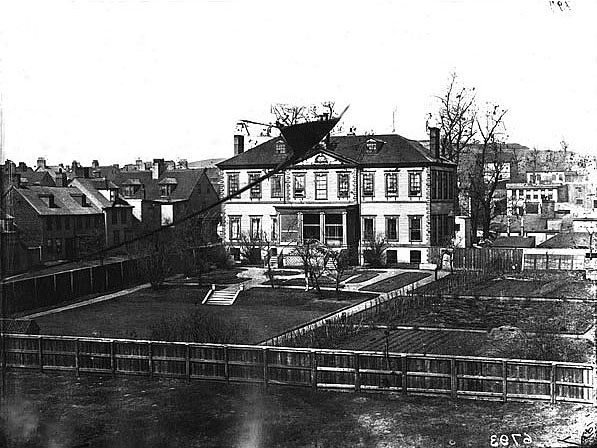
The original Bellevue House, burned down around 1885 and rebuilt. Its replacement was demolished in 1955 and the site became a parking lot.

Before construction began, an archaeological dig was undertaken to evaluate the remains of Bellevue House. The land was originally purchased in 1800 by the Duke of Kent, who was based in the city in order to command British forces in North America. Subsequent British commanders took residence in the house, built 1801 and described as an "almost palatial residence" that hosted members of the Royal Family during visits to the colony. It was destroyed in an 1885 fire, but rebuilt. The British left in the early 20th century and the structure was demolished after it was acquired by the Nova Scotia Technical College in 1955. The site then remained a parking lot for over half a century, meaning the foundation of older structures was preserved under the asphalt. This stands in contrast to the site of the former infirmary next door, where the deep foundation rendered the site archaeologically insignificant. In addition to the foundation of the residence, the archaeological dig uncovered numerous small artefacts including china, cutlery and an 1860 Nova Scotia penny.

Construction of the library by EllisDon began shortly thereafter. Following excavation and blasting for the underground car park, the foundation was poured in 2012. In May 2014, the library hosted a tour for journalists and officials from all levels of government. Halifax mayor Mike Savage stated that the new library is "not simply something that's nice to have. It is important and critical to the future of our city. Because more than ever, for a city to succeed, we need to be invested in the knowledge economy. We need to ensure that our citizens have access to all forms of learning."

The total cost of the building was CA$57.6 million, of which CA$18.3 million came from the federal government via the Building Canada Fund, $13 million from the provincial government, and the remainder ($26.3 million) from the municipality. The municipal contribution was primarily generated from the sale of the empty lots around the library site.

The library was completed in late 2014 following the transfer of materials from the former library across the street, which closed on 30 August. It opened to the public on Saturday, 13 December 2014 to an estimated 12,000 visitors who enjoyed a day of performances and festivities. The first six weeks of operation saw 272,000 visitors, who collectively checked out over 167,700 items.

== Design and reception ==
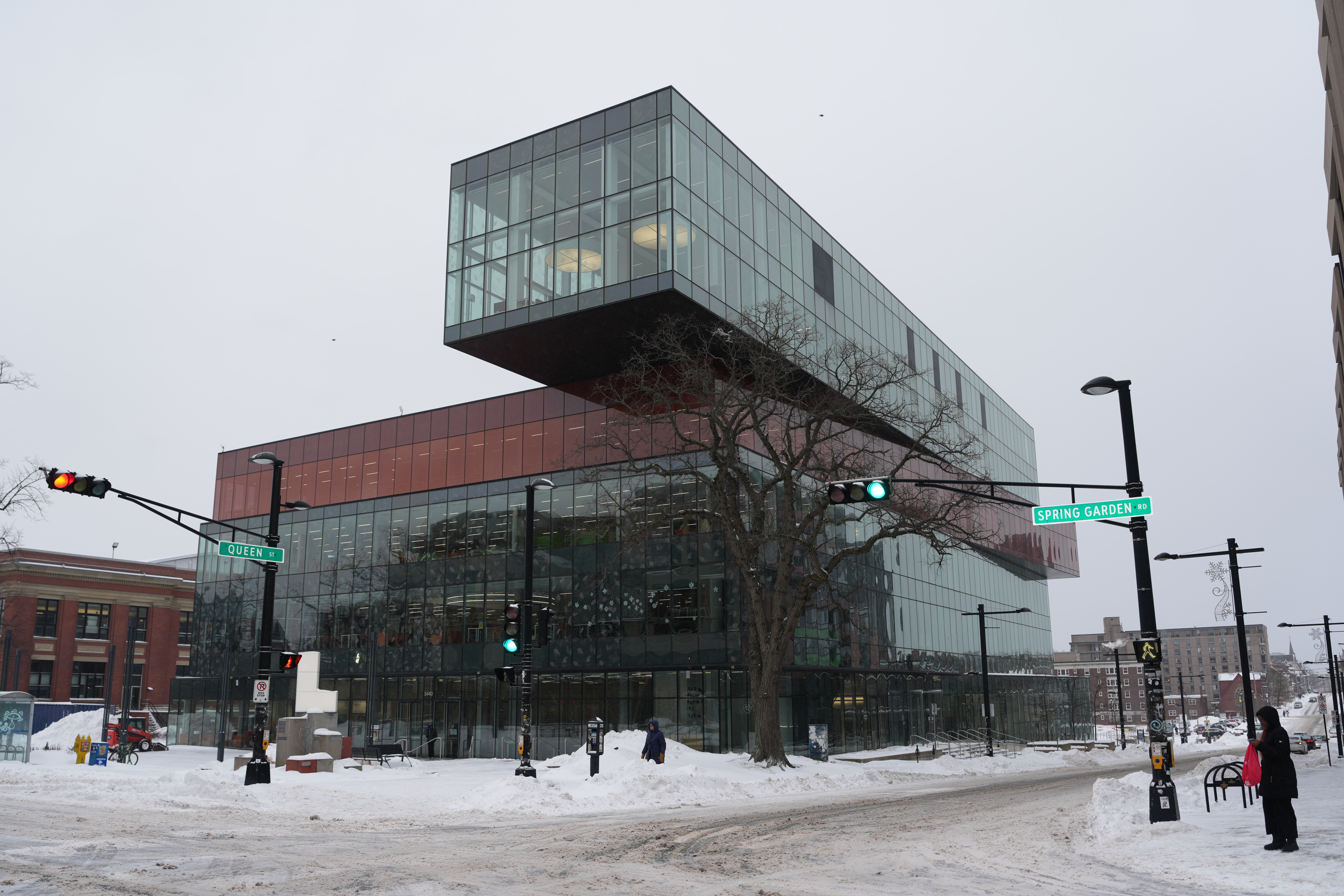
The "Halifax Living Room" is housed in the cantilevered fifth storey.

The library is a five-storey structure comprising about 11,000 square metres (120,000 sq ft) of space, and was designed to accommodate a book collection 50 per cent larger than that of the former Spring Garden Memorial Library. A skylighted atrium, criss-crossed by stairs and walkways, spans the interior height of the structure. The main lobby and children's collection are concentrated on the lower floors, while much of the upper floors are designated as quiet areas. A rooftop terrace with seating offers a broad view of Downtown, the South End, and Halifax Harbour.

The design, said to resemble a stack of books, has garnered international attention and was featured by CNN as one of ten "eye-popping" new buildings of 2014. The building topped a list of "high-design libraries" compiled by enRoute and was covered on numerous architecture websites. In the 2014 "Best of Halifax" awards, ranked annually by readers of The Coast, the library was voted the "Best Thing To Happen In Halifax In The Past Year" and the "Best Effort To Improve Halifax". SNC-Lavalin, the structural and civil engineer, was awarded the "Engineering a Better Canada Award" by the Association of Canadian Engineering Companies for their work on the library. The building was also shortlisted for the World Building of the Year Award in the Civic and Community category at the 2015 World Architecture Festival in Singapore. Wired ranked it among the 10 most beautiful libraries in the world.

The Nova Scotia Association of Architects selected the library to receive the Award of Merit at the Lieutenant Governor's Design Awards in Architecture. The award was presented in 2015 by Brigadier-General J.J. Grant. The awards jury commented: "Without doubt, the new Halifax Central Library has done more to transform the discussion of contemporary architecture in Halifax than any building in the past 40 years. The Halifax Central Library was a real catalyst of local, public and architectural conversation in Halifax; its program and location has reconstructed the way locals and visitors interact with a building filled with knowledge."

In 2016 the library won a Governor General's Medal in Architecture. It was the only Atlantic Canadian project among the 12 medalists. The jury's commendation read:

This outstanding new civic building is a community gathering place that responds to the diversity of its users, accommodating many more activities than the traditional library. This 21st century facility is topped by the Halifax Living Room: an inviting, light and playful public space with views across Halifax as far as the harbour. Other spaces provide for learning, reading, exercising, studying, hanging out and playing. The reception area's generous atrium with its beautiful stairway is the hub connecting the functions and users. The jury commends the process of early user engagement that led to the design—the public's embrace of the building is a testament to its value.

— 2016 jury, Governor General's Medals in Architecture,

Centrally located on Spring Garden Road, the library has become a popular community gathering place. Canadian Architect called it "the most significant public building completed in the Nova Scotia capital in over a generation, and a new cultural hub for the region". An architect from Fowler, Bauld & Mitchell stated that the library now sees an average of 6,000 visitors daily, a "huge increase" in patronage over the former Spring Garden Road Memorial Library.

== Programme ==
The library is fully wheelchair-accessible, with multiple elevators. There are public use touchscreen computers, a dedicated computer lab, wireless internet, and conference and community rooms. An automatic conveyor belt system links the book drops to a dedicated sorting room. It handled 80,000 books in July 2015.

The library's open design and central location enables it to host community events and festivals. In the first year of operation it has served as a venue for major annual Halifax events including Nocturne and The Word on the Street. It hosted the Duke of Edinburgh's Award ceremony in November 2015 attended by Prince Edward.

=== Cafés ===
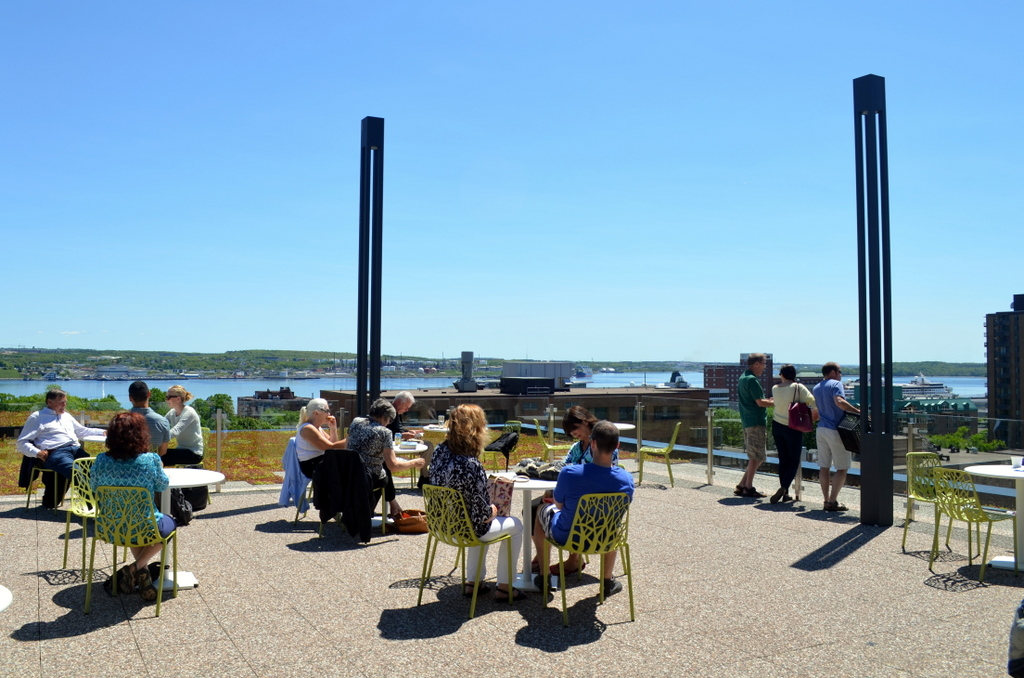
Rooftop terrace

The building houses two café spaces, one at ground level and one on the fifth floor. Patrons of the latter café have access to a rooftop patio area as well as the "Halifax Living Room" housed in the cantilevered portion of the building overlooking Spring Garden Road. The Living Room was designed as an airy, indoor public space with views of both Citadel Hill and Halifax Harbour as well as the civic square below. The ground floor café, in the corner of the building nearest the intersection, opens earlier than the rest of the library. The concession to operate from both spaces was won by Pavia Gallery Espresso Bar and Café of Herring Cove, who beat out Second Cup and Uncommon Grounds. Pavia holds a ten-year contract with an option for an additional seven years.

The ground floor space is the "main café" with the same offerings as Pavia's Herring Cove location, while the smaller upstairs café serves light refreshments only. Pavia plans to hold three art-related panel discussions at the library each year.

=== Artwork ===
Following a request for proposals seeking a "signature public artwork" to be incorporated into the new library, painter and NSCAD alumnus Cliff Eyland was awarded the $430,000 commission for his proposal to produce 5,000 miniature paintings on medium-density fibreboard cut to the size of old library catalog index cards.

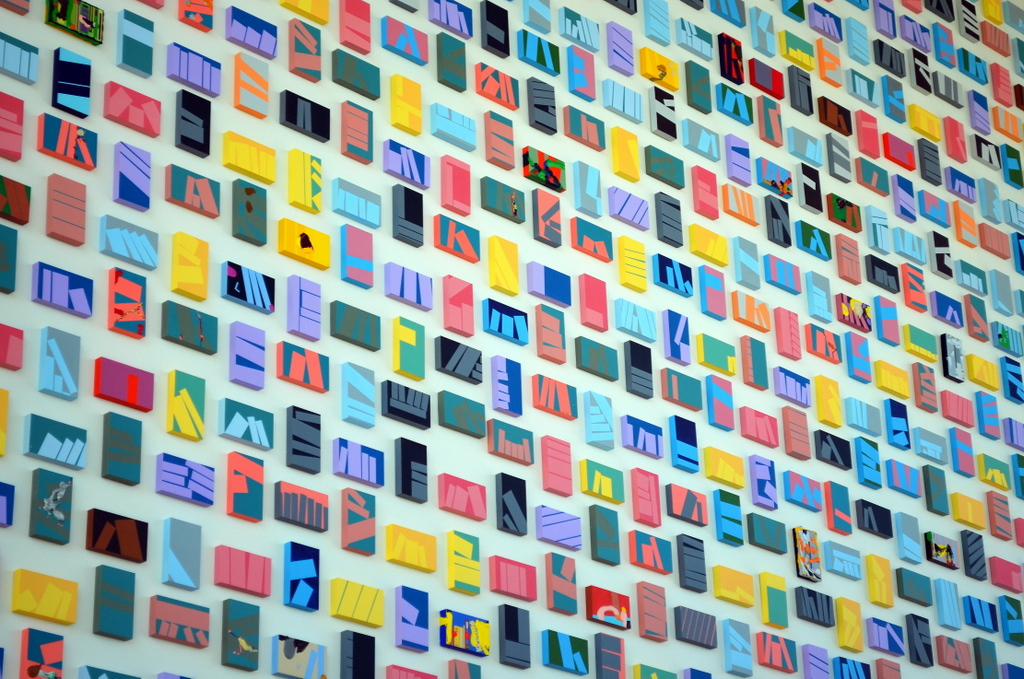
Book Shelf Paintings by Cliff Eyland

Eyland, who also worked as a curator at the former Technical University of Nova Scotia next door (now Dalhousie University's School of Architecture and Planning), ended up producing a total of 6,000 paintings divided into two installations. At the ground floor, Library Cards comprises 5,000 paintings behind the main reception. A further 1,000 paintings, "eye-popping, two-colour abstracts of books leaning against each other", decorate the Living Room in the fifth floor cantilever. This smaller installation is titled Book Shelf Paintings.

The Library Cards paintings cover a variety of themes and subjects, including landscapes, portraits, abstract pieces, and musings on history and libraries. The artist joked, "there are grey landscapes to remind you about why you stay indoors in Nova Scotia to read" and said that portraits of staff at the Spring Garden Road and Halifax North Memorial libraries, photographed by Mary Ann Archibald, were painted and had subsequently been recognized by some of their subjects. He also stated that the library commission is the biggest installation he has done to date.

=== Auditorium ===
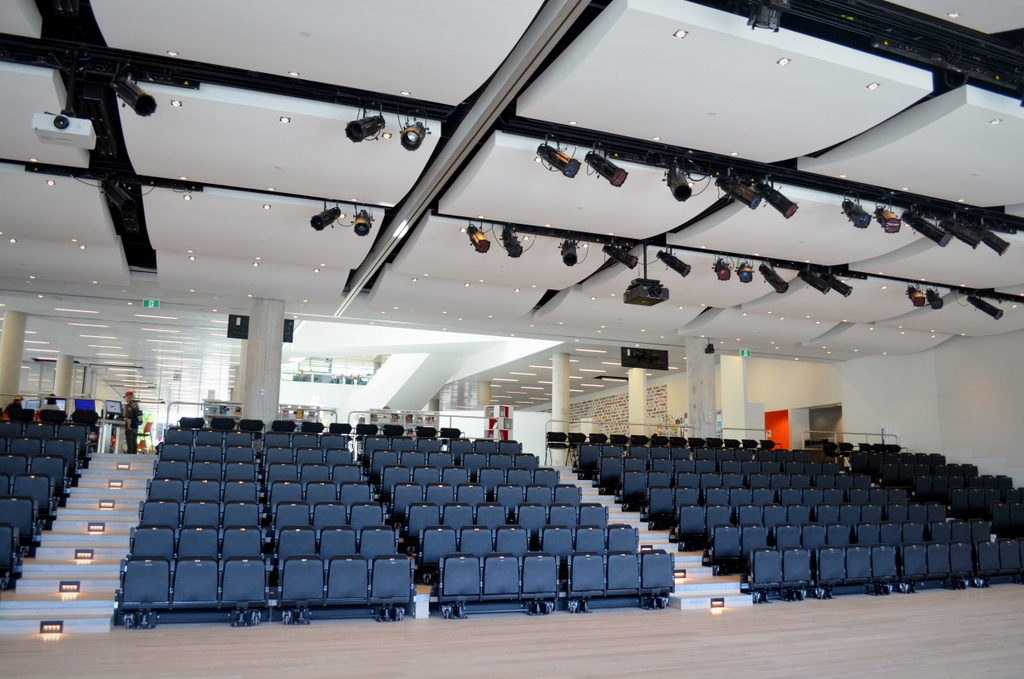
Paul O'Regan Hall

The ground floor houses a 300-seat auditorium which also serves as a reading space when not in use for performances. Library CEO Judith Hare stated that the space would complement a recording studio, geared toward young people, planned elsewhere in the library: "people can make their own music... but also they'll have a place to perform as well." In 2012 the auditorium was named Paul O'Regan Hall following a $1 million donation by the O'Regan family in honour of the late businessman and philanthropist. Government funding only covered the cost of the building, so donations will go toward expanding the book collection and purchasing new computers and special equipment. The hall is fitted with stowable seats, acoustic ceiling baffles, a video screen, and professional sound and lighting installations.

The hall boasts a $62,000 Yamaha grand piano donated by local philanthropist and musician Peggy Corkum in May 2015.

=== Environmental sustainability ===
The library incorporates many energy and water saving design features such as rainwater harvesting for flushing water, computerized building management, use of local species in landscape design, and automatic lighting control. Low-emission interior finishes have been used to improve indoor air quality, and a green housekeeping policy seeks to reduce exposure of occupants to contaminants.

On 15 September 2016 the library was certified LEED Gold by the Canada Green Building Council.

The library supports the use of public transportation and active transportation by virtue of its central location in a dense, walkable district served by numerous bus routes, and by providing onsite bike parking.

== Notes ==
References

- Beckman Associates (1994). Halifax Regional Library Space and Services: Needs Assessment Study (PDF). Halifax: Halifax Regional Library.
- Community Services Department (1996). Towards A New Central Library (PDF). Halifax: Halifax City Regional Library.
- A.J. Diamond, Donald Schmitt and Company (1997). Central Library Project: Study for the Halifax Regional Library (PDF). Halifax: Halifax Regional Library Board.
- Terrain Group (2004). Halifax Public Libraries: Needs Assessment and Facilities Master Plan Final Report (PDF). Halifax: Halifax Public Libraries.
