= Millennium Library (Winnipeg) =

Winnipeg's Downtown public library

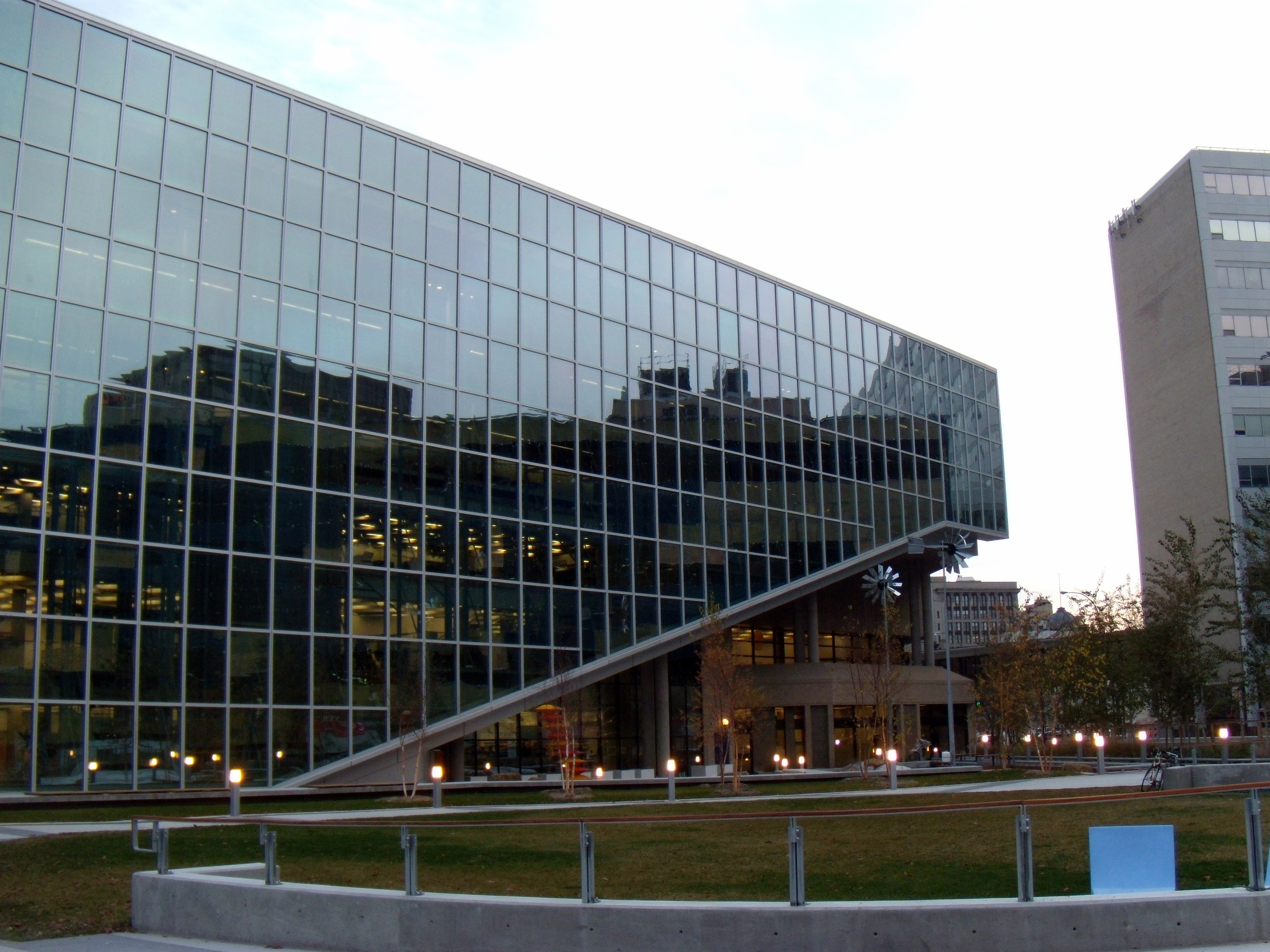
- Winnipeg's Millennium Library
- 49.892°N 97.142°W
- Location: 251 Donald Street; Winnipeg, Manitoba, Canada; R3C 3P5
- Type: Public library
- Established: May 16, 1977; 49 years ago (Centennial Library); November 8, 2005; 20 years ago (Millennium Library)
- Service area: Downtown Winnipeg
- Branch of: Winnipeg Public Library

Other information
- Website: wpl.winnipeg.ca/library/branchpages/branch.aspx?mill
- Building details

General information
- Groundbreaking: December 20, 1974
- Construction started: March 1975
- Construction stopped: 1977
- Renovated: 2003-2005
- Cost: $9 m CAD
- Renovation cost: $18 million

Technical details
- Size: 17,600 m^{2} (189,000 sq ft)
- Floor count: 4

Design and construction
- Architecture firm: Ward, MacDonald, Cockburn, McLeod and McFee
- Engineer: Scouten Mitchell Sigurdson & Assoc. (mechanical and electrical)
- Structural engineer: Crosier Greenberg and Partners
- Main contractor: Poole Construction Ltd.
- Awards: Canadian Architect Award of Excellence (2004); Prairie Design Award of Merit (2006); Governor General's Medal in Architecture (2008)

Renovating team
- Architects: John Patkau (Patkau Architects); David Kressock (LM Architectural Group)

Other information
- Parking: 535 stalls
- Public transit: Winnipeg Transit; F5 F8

The Millennium Library (known as the Centennial Library from 1977 to 2005) is the main branch of the Winnipeg Public Library system, located in downtown Winnipeg, Manitoba, Canada. The library is located at 251 Donald Street, and serves approximately 5,000 visitors each day.

The four-storey, 17,600-square-metre (189,000 sq ft) library boasts a local history room, public art, information displays, a grand staircase, as well as access to the Winnipeg Walkway system. The Best of Friends Gift Shop is also situated within the building.

== History ==
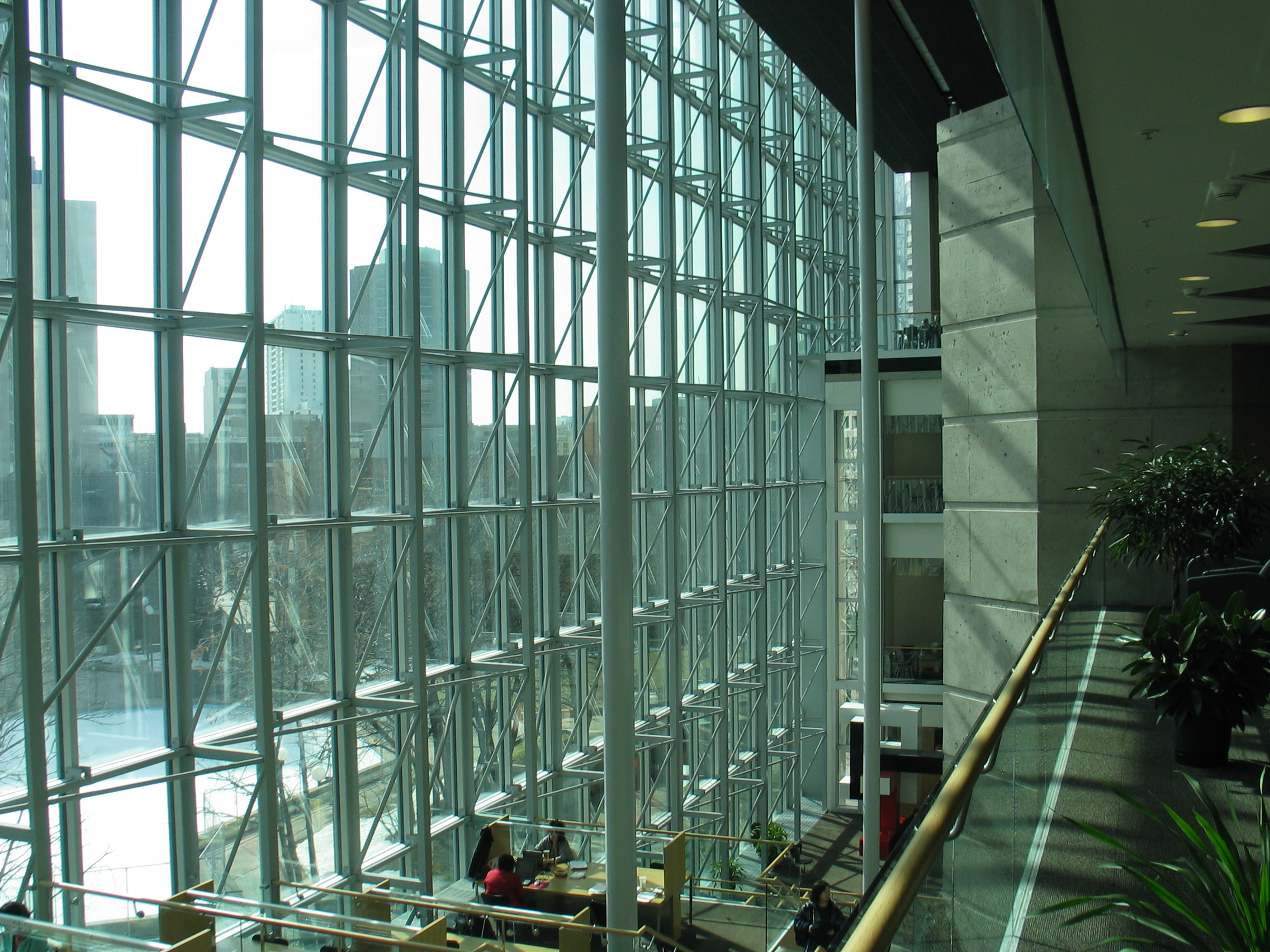
Interior reading terrace

In May 1968, Mayor Stephen Juba proposed that a new Centennial Library be built by 1970 to honour Manitoba's 100th birthday and to replace the Carnegie-funded main branch of the Winnipeg Public Library at 380 William Avenue (now the City of Winnipeg Archives). A plan was put in place to relocate the main branch on Graham Avenue between Smith and Donald Streets, on the site of Columbus Hall (Aragon Building) where Bell Drugs, Rainbow Dance Gardens, and J's Discotheque were located. In March 1969, the city announced that it wanted to purchase the land between Graham & St. Mary and Smith & Donald for $1.75 million.

In December 1973, Ward, MacDonald, Cockburn, McLeod and McFeetors were selected as the architectural firm to design the new library, while the construction tender was awarded to Poole Construction Ltd. (now PCL). While the original cost of the project—including the library and underground parking—was estimated at $8,478,462, that figure had risen to $9 million by the end, for which the province chipped in $900,000. A sod-turning ceremony to commence construction was held on 20 December 1974, with actual construction beginning in the following March. The new library would have room for 600,000 books within its space of 350,000 square feet.

The 550-vehicle underground parkade opened first, in early December 1976. Winnipeg Public Library's Central branch (380 William Ave) closed on 21 February 1977 and its Downtown branch (408 Portage Ave) closed February 25 allowing materials to be moved over to the new Centennial Library.

The Centennial Library was officially opened to the public on 16 May 1977, four months later than originally calculated, due to a construction strike and winter work conditions. Fifty-five hundred people visited on opening day, and 5,188 books and magazines were checked out. Councillor Al Ducharme (ICEC – St. Vital) greeted members of the public and borrowed the first book at the new library.

Prior to 2003, the Library has undergone interior alterations in 1985, 1986, 1989, 1990, 1991, 1992, 1993, 1994, 1995, 1996; as well as interior and exterior changes to the library parkade in 1991, 1992 and 1993.

=== Expansion ===
Started in 2003 and completed in 2005, the $21-million redevelopment of the Centennial Library involved the addition of 3,700 square metres (40,000 sq ft) of new space, construction of a new fourth floor, and renovations throughout the existing 10,000-square-metre (110,000 sq ft) library. The library now features a new Reading Terrace with a four-storey high solar glass wall, positioned alongside a new grand staircase, along with two new glass elevators, and a passive solar wall on the southeast face of the building.

The design of the library won the Canadian Architect magazine Award of Excellence for 2004, the first design of a Winnipeg building to ever receive the award.

The Millennium Library opened on 8 November 2005 after $18 million of renovations were constructed over a two-year period. The work was completed a year late and $4 million over budget.

In 2013, Toronto-Dominion Bank presented a $150,000 gift to be used towards renovations of Millennium Library's TD New and Noted area. The renovations included open-concept space, as well as direct access to Millennium Library Park.

== Floor plan ==
=== First floor (Reader services) ===
The first floor includes the following areas:

- Reader Services – Adult fiction: mysteries, science fiction/fantasy, romance, graphic novels, inspirational, and westerns
  - TD New & Noted (sponsored by Toronto-Dominion Bank) – New books (Adults); Express bestsellers; Paperbacks and magazines
- Children's and Teen Services – Children's fiction and non-fiction; audiobooks and music; DVD, Blu-ray, and video movies; Paperbacks, magazines, and graphic novels; and Ah kha koo gheesh
  - Teen Central – Teen fiction and non-fiction books, paperbacks, magazines, and graphic novels, as well as computers and study space for teens only.

The first floor also includes memberships; check-ins; returns, holds, and checkout (including self-checkout); the Aboriginal Reading-in-the-Round; express computers; a Winnipeg Transit kiosk; and a security desk.

=== Second floor (Special services) ===
The second floor includes:

- Writer-in-Residence
- Movies: DVD, Blu-ray and NFB Film (and a DVD/Blu-ray viewing station)
- Music: CD, scores
- Large-print books, magazines
- Audiobooks
- Wii ghoss (Aboriginal Resources)
- Multilingual, ABE (adult literacy), ESL, Learn English
- DAISY, Talking Books, Talking Terminals, TTY
- Meeting and tutorial rooms: Anhang Room, Buchwald Room, Carol Shields Auditorium, Dr. Anne Smigel Room, Blankstein Art Gallery, Meeting Room 1, and Tutorial Rooms 1 and 2.

The second floor also houses the Winnipeg Library Foundation and connects to the Winnipeg Skywalk.

=== Third floor (Micromedia services) ===
The third floor includes: newspapers and microfilm; a study room; book sales; a light therapy lamp; and the "Richardson Reading Terrace".

=== Fourth floor (Information services) ===
The fourth floor includes:

- Adult non-fiction (000-999)
- Biographies
- Reference work
- Maps and atlases
- Government documents
- Local History Room – a reference-only collection that features community history of Manitoba.
  - Local history fiction & non-fiction
  - Henderson Directories
  - Vertical files
- Meeting Rooms
  - Computer training lab
  - Meeting Room 2

== Millennium Library Park ==
Millennium Library Park is the park and plaza that sits alongside the Millennium Library.

Finished 2012, the park underwent a $4.3-million reconstruction. The rebuilt plaza has an artificial wetland aerated by a pair of windmills, a wooden walkway built out of sustainably-farmed wood, birch trees planted in deep pots, two new pieces of public art, and low fences and a raised floor.

The park now features five distinct outdoor zones:

- The Millennium Plaza
- Crossroads Plaza
- The Learning Commons
- The Urban Wetland
- The Jim Pattison Foundation Reading Garden

When the Millennium Library reopened, there was no money left in the budget to rebuild the park. Work on the park could not commence until a membrane was built over the parkade below it. Rebuilding the plaza itself was funded equally by all three levels of government. The Winnipeg Arts Council arranged financing for the two pieces of public art: Sentinel of Truth and emptyful.

Reconstruction costs:

- $2.1 million to rebuild the plaza
- $1.5 million to replace a membrane over the roof of the Millennium Library Parkade
- $575,000 to commission and install "emptyful"
- $90,000 for "Sentinel of Truth"

The redevelopment plan was spearheaded by the Winnipeg Library Foundation.

== Public art ==
The following public art installations are viewable in and around the Millennium Library:

- Bill Pechet's "emptyful" (Park) – a stainless-steel sculpture including water elements
- Darren Stebeleski's "Sentinel of Truth" (Park) – a wall of weathering steel, covering and protecting bits of text inscribed into stainless steel.
- Cliff Eyland's "Untitled" (Lobby)
- Nicholas Wade's "Illumination" (Richardson Reading Terrace base)
- Charlie Johnson's "Story Lines" mural (Skywalk)
- J.A. Long's "Andrew Carnegie" portrait (Richardson Reading Terrace)
- Timothy Ray and Dale Amundson's "A.R. or R.A." (Children's Services)

"emptyful", the erlenmeyer flask-shaped fountain, is the most expensive piece of public art in Winnipeg history. It is illuminated by four bands of LED lights at night and uses both water and fog. During the summer, when the fog and water elements will be operational, the fountain is illuminated in blue, green and purples hues. During the winter, when the water elements are not operational, the artwork is lit up with reds, oranges and yellows.

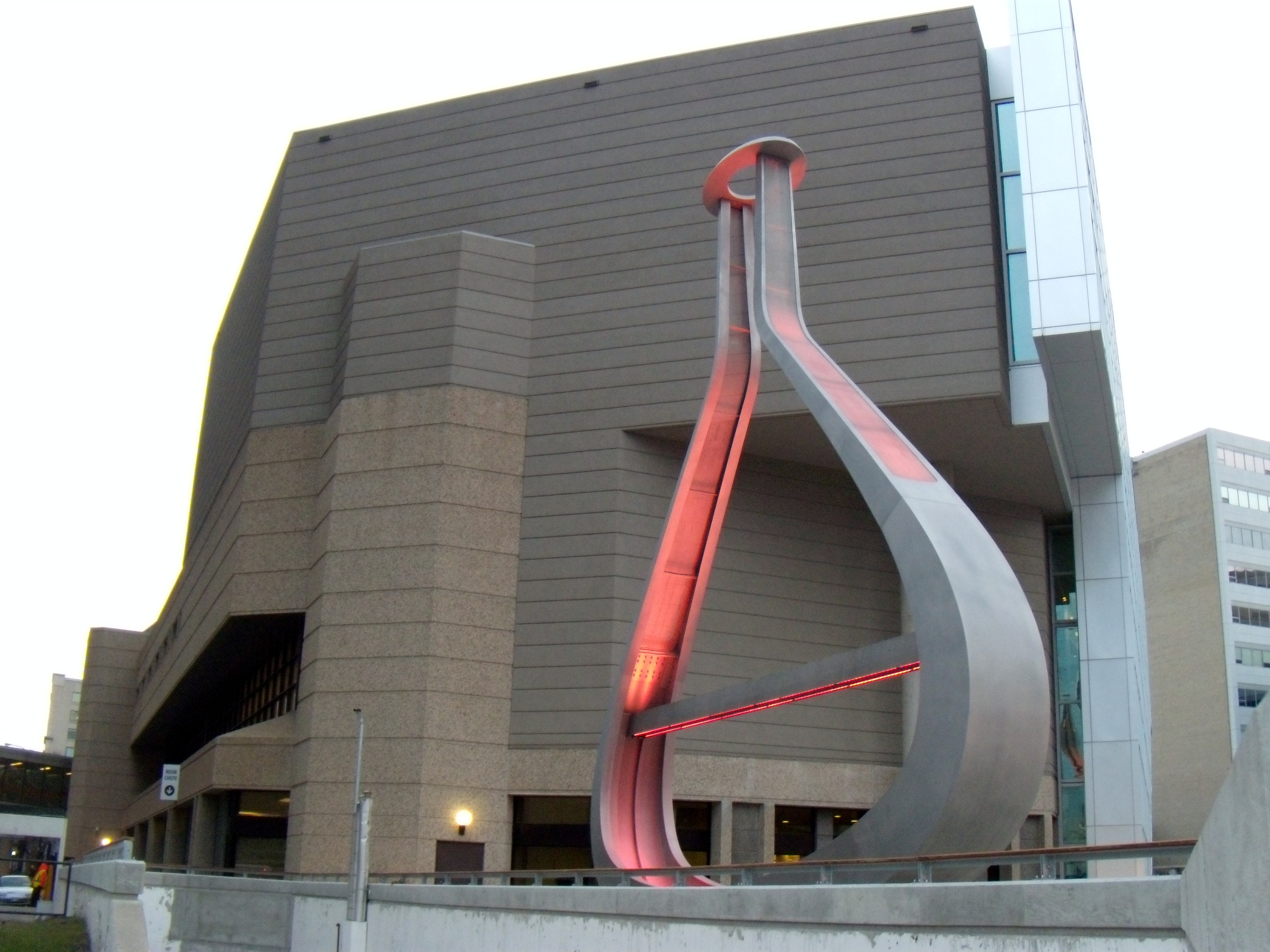
emptyful (in Winter)

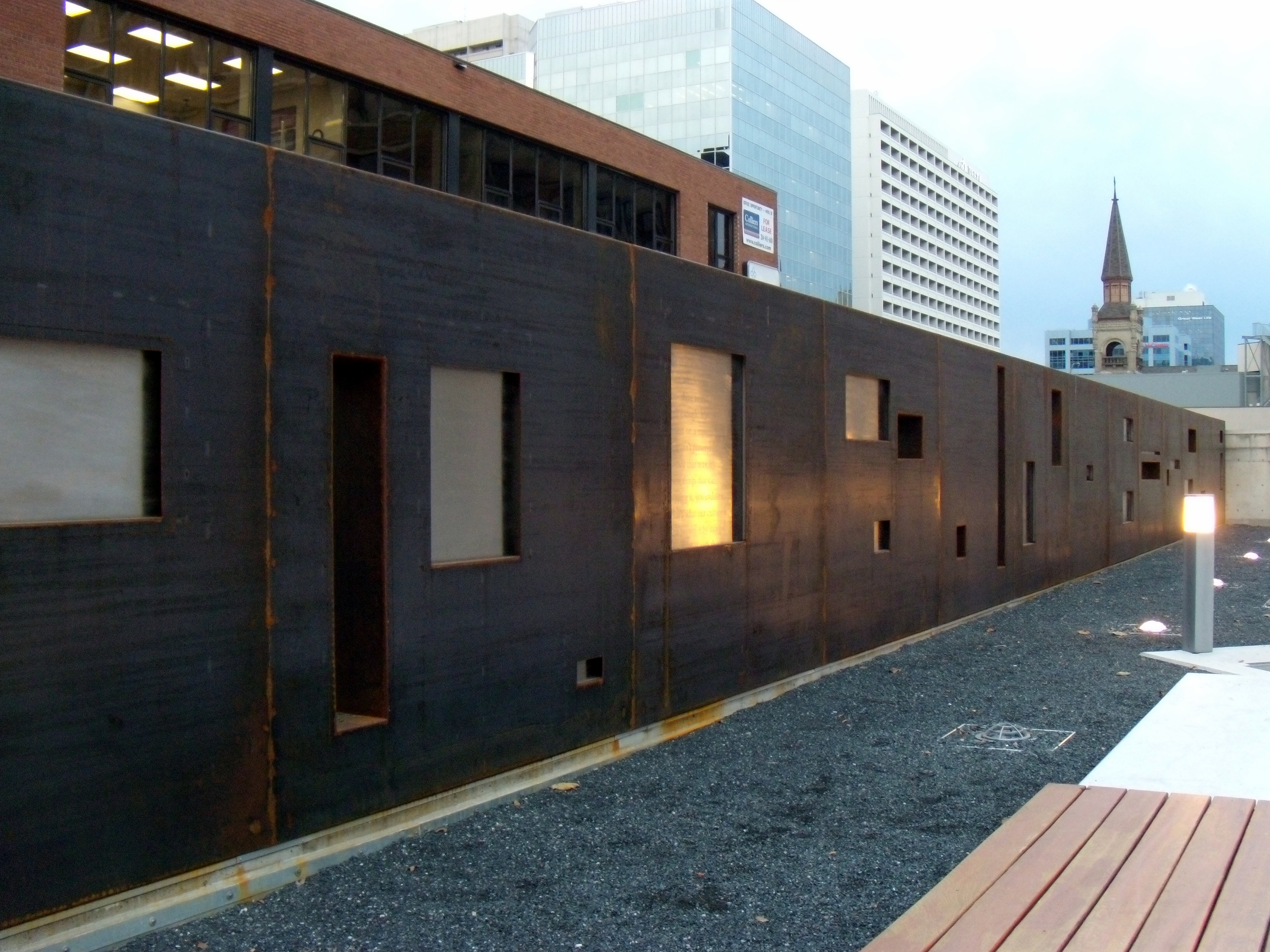
Sentinel of Truth

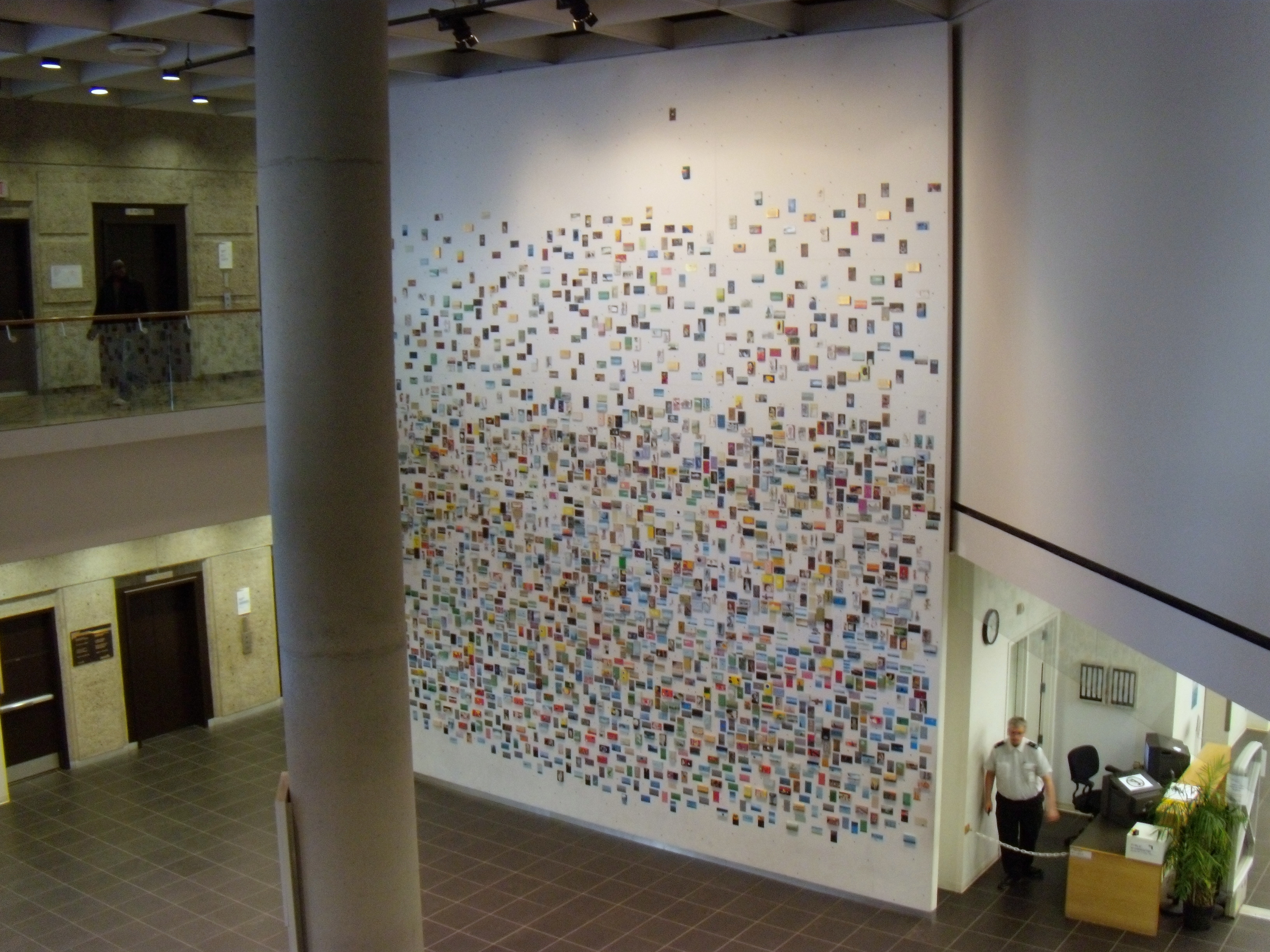
Cliff Eyland's "Untitled", in the lobby

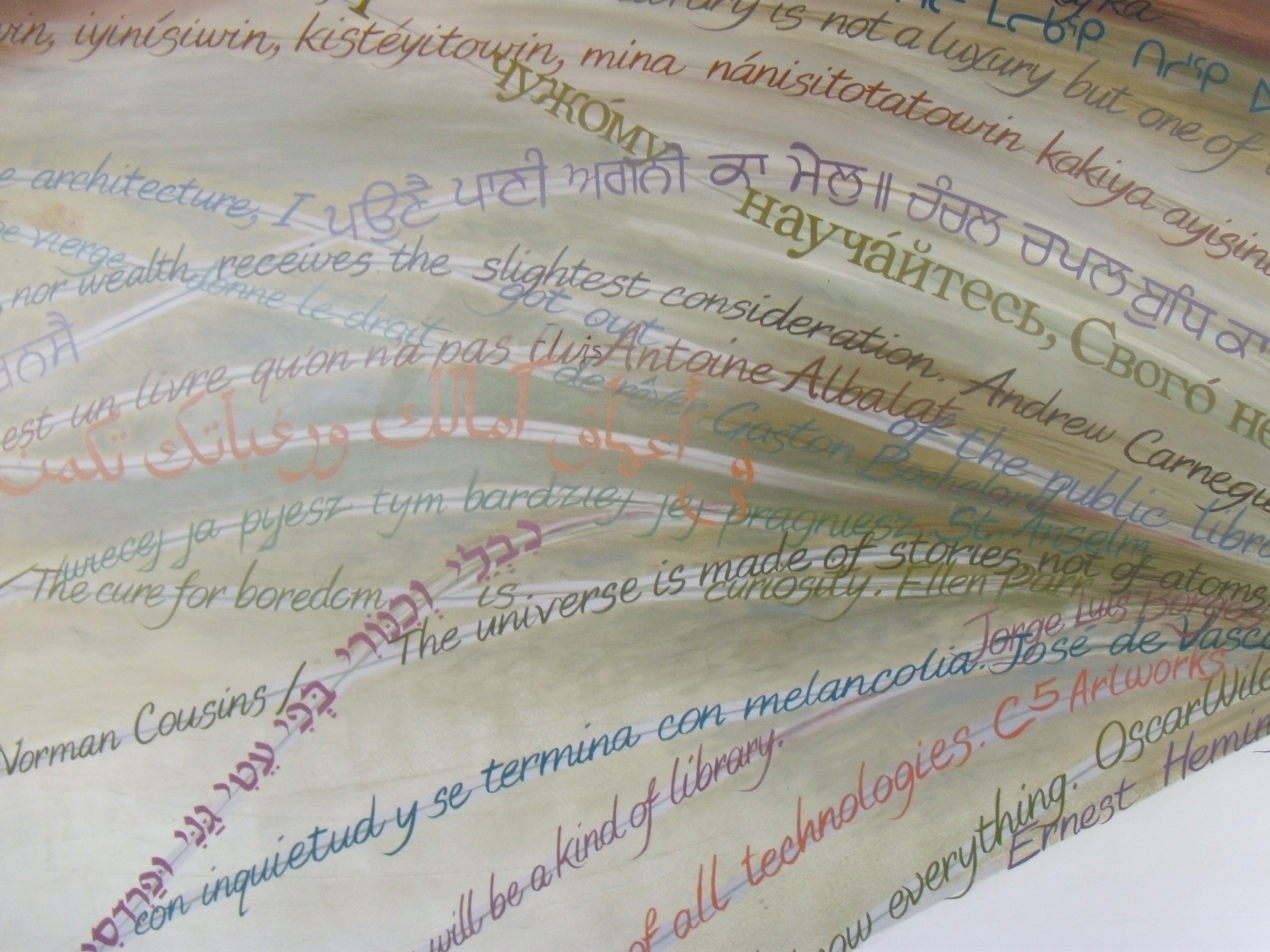
Detail of Charlie Johnson's "Story Lines" mural

== Security issues ==
Security issues at the Millennium Library have increased since 1989.

Numerous incidents involving aggressive visitors to the library, some involving weapons, open liquor have been documented by the Winnipeg Police Service and the head of the Winnipeg Public Library. In early 2019 the staff of the library felt that they needed to increase the level of security, to protect both the staff who provide assistance and for patrons who are there to study. Measures were taken, where weapons and liquor were held by a private security firm and could be collected after the library visitor had left.

When the new security protocol came into effect on 28 February 2019, a group of university students had created an ad-hoc group, opposing the changes, saying it invades patrons' privacy.

The library reported in early September 2019 that the new security measures had the intended effect of decreasing the numbers of aggressive patrons who bring in weapons and/or alcohol. However, it has also had the unintended effect of decreasing the numbers of legitimate patrons who are there to study.

In February 2020, musician John K. Samson wrote and released "Millennium for All", a song supporting the activist campaign against the security restrictions.

In December 2022, a man was fatally stabbed at the library, with the library being temporarily closed as a result.
