= Elizabeth Greenleaf Pattee =

American architect (1893–1991)

- Born: 1893; Quincy, Massachusetts
- Died: 1991 (aged 97–98); Hightstown, New Jersey
- Education: Massachusetts Institute of Technology, Lowthorpe School of Landscape Architecture
- Occupation: Architect
- Spouse: Arthur Coleman Comey
- Awards: Fellow American Institute of Architects
- Practice: Pattee and Peters

Elizabeth Greenleaf Pattee (1893–1991) was an American architect, landscape architect, and architecture professor in the Northeast whose career spanned a half century.

== About ==
Pattee was born in 1893 in Quincy, Massachusetts. She was descended from an old New England family; portraits of several of her Greenleaf ancestors were painted by the Colonial-era painter Joseph Blackburn, and she would in later life donate a Christian Gullager portrait of her great-great-granduncle Daniel Greenleaf to the National Portrait Gallery.

Pattee received her undergraduate degree in architecture from the Massachusetts Institute of Technology in 1916 with a thesis on the subject of designing a day school for girls. She spent the next two years in Groton, Massachusetts, at the Lowthorpe School of Landscape Architecture for Women and obtained her diploma around 1918.

In 1950, Pattee married fellow landscape architect Arthur Coleman Comey, also a city planner. He died four years later.

== Career ==
Pattee's professional career spanned five decades. Early on, she worked for several architects before striking out on her own, including the firm of Stone and Webster (1919–21) and Lois Howe and Eleanor Manning. In 1922, she opened her own practice in Boston with landscape architect Constance E. Peters. Pattee and Peters worked together into the 1940s, focusing their work on landscape design that was practical and took the entire site into consideration. One of their first commissions was Killian Court, a key public space on MIT's campus and part of a larger design that was later expanded on by Mabel Keyes Babcock. Other commissions included the gardens of the headquarters of the Colonial Dames of America in Connecticut and the gardens at the Kimball-Jenkins Estate (1929) in New Hampshire, which is now an art school.

Pattee also taught at the Lowthorpe School for over twenty years, at one point serving as acting principal. From 1945 to 1963, she was an instructor at the Rhode Island School of Design (which absorbed the Lowthorpe School in 1945), heading up the landscape architecture department in two periods (1946–52, 1955–59).

Pattee occasionally contributed articles on landscape design to Landscape Architecture and other magazines.

Pattee became a fellow of the American Institute of Architects in 1933 and in 1964 was a founding member of the New Jersey Chapter of the American Society of Landscape Architects (and the sole woman among the founders). She was also a member of the International Federation of Landscape Architects and the American Society of Landscape Architects, to which she was elected in 1961.

Pattee retired to Hightstown, New Jersey and died there in 1991.
