= Elizabeth Blodget Lord =

Elizabeth Blodget Lord (1887–1974) was a founding partner of Lord & Schryver, the first female owned and operated landscape architecture firm in the Pacific Northwest from 1929 to 1969.

== Early years ==
Elizabeth Lord was born on November 12, 1887, in Salem, Oregon, to a prominent Pacific Northwest family. When she was eight years old, her father, William Paine Lord, was elected Oregon’s ninth governor. Lord’s mother, Juliet Montague Lord, was a social activist and avid gardener who travelled extensively, often accompanied by her daughter. In 1899 her father was appointed United States minister to the Argentine and the family moved to Buenos Aires for two years. There Lord studied at the Language School for Girls, becoming fluent in Spanish. She returned to Oregon in 1904 and studied at St Helen’s Hall in Portland, graduating in 1904.

William P. Lord died in 1911, leaving a substantial estate for his wife and children. Elizabeth spent the next 15 years as her mother’s companion, travelling extensively and helping her mother establish the Salem Floral Society, the first garden club in Oregon. Lord states “I had a tremendous love of gardens and civic improvement subject that I inherited from her.”

When Mrs. Lord died in 1924, Lord’s brother encouraged her to pursue a career in landscape architecture. In the fall of 1926, the 38-year-old Lord enrolled in the Lowthorpe School of Landscape Architecture for Women located in Groton, Massachusetts. The coursework was intensive and lasted three years. It included architectural drafting, freehand and perspective drawing, construction, surveying, site engineering, history of architecture and landscape architecture, soils, plant materials, elementary forestry, botany, and entomology.

In the summer of 1927, Lord joined Lowthorpe’s European Travel Course co-sponsored by Harvard’s Cambridge School of Domestic and Landscape Architecture for Women. The three-month tour was limited to twenty women interested in landscape design. It introduced participants to the great historic monuments of Europe including country houses, villas, and their associated gardens. Lord visited and photographed gardens in England, France, and Italy. During this journey, she met Edith Schryver, a Lowthorpe alumni 14 years her junior. At the end of the tour, Lord and Schryver stayed an extra month in Europe, traveling through Germany and Spain. After the tour, Lord returned to Lowthorpe to complete her coursework while Schryver returned to Ellen Biddle Shipman’s landscape architecture firm in New York City where she worked as a draftsman.

During the next year, Lord and Schryver stayed in contact and discussed plans for establishing their own landscape architecture firm in Salem, Oregon, Lord’s hometown. Lord recalls, “I met Edith and she wanted to come west and forget the crowds of New York City. They traveled west in December 1928, settling in the Lord family home in Salem where they established the first firm of women landscape architects in the Pacific Northwest.

== Professional work ==
From 1929 to 1969, Lord's firm designed over 200 gardens including residential, civic, and public spaces. Lord focused on plant selection and composition while Schryver’s expertise was engineering and construction.

Lord lectured at local garden clubs, wrote articles for local and regional publications, and participated in a Corvallis-based radio show called “The Home Garden Hour.”

In her later years, Lord’s interest moved to public works. She served on Salem’s Parks Board, the Capitol Planning Commission, and its Tree Committee for more than a decade and is responsible for design work in many of Salem’s parks and in the landscape of its schools and public buildings. Lord held leadership roles in the Salem Garden Club, the Portland Garden Club, the Garden Club of America, and the Salem Art Association.

Lord retired from professional practice and closed the firm in 1969. She died in Salem in 1976 in the home she shared with Schryver for over 40 years. Upon Schryver’s death in 1984, the firm's professional papers were archived at the University of Oregon, home of the only state school of landscape architecture. Lord and Schryver's home, Gaiety Hollow, was placed on the National Register of Historic Places in 2014.
