= Edith Henderson =

American landscape architect (1911–2005)

- Born: Edith Harrison; June 9, 1911; Charlotte, North Carolina, United States
- Died: October 12, 2005 (aged 94); Atlanta, Georgia, United States
- Occupation: Architect
- Spouse: James Henderson
- Practice: Edith Harrison and Grace Campbell, Landscape Architects

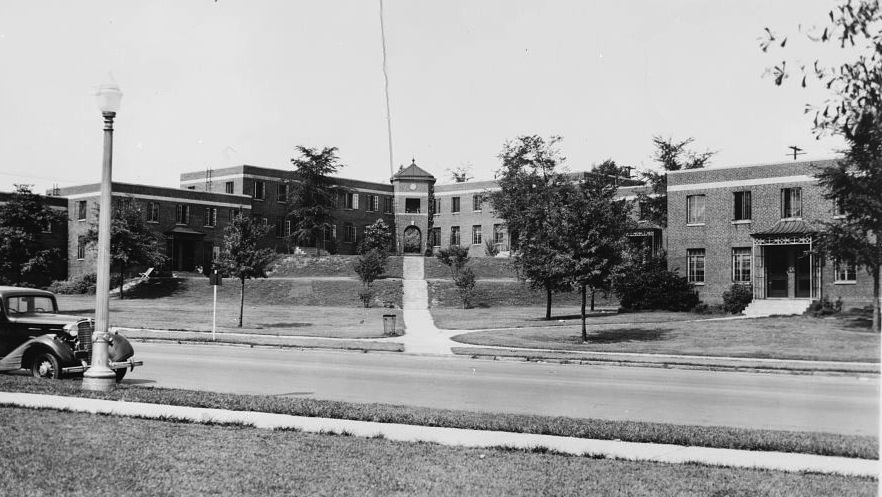
Techwood Homes, Atlanta, Georgia, late 1930s.

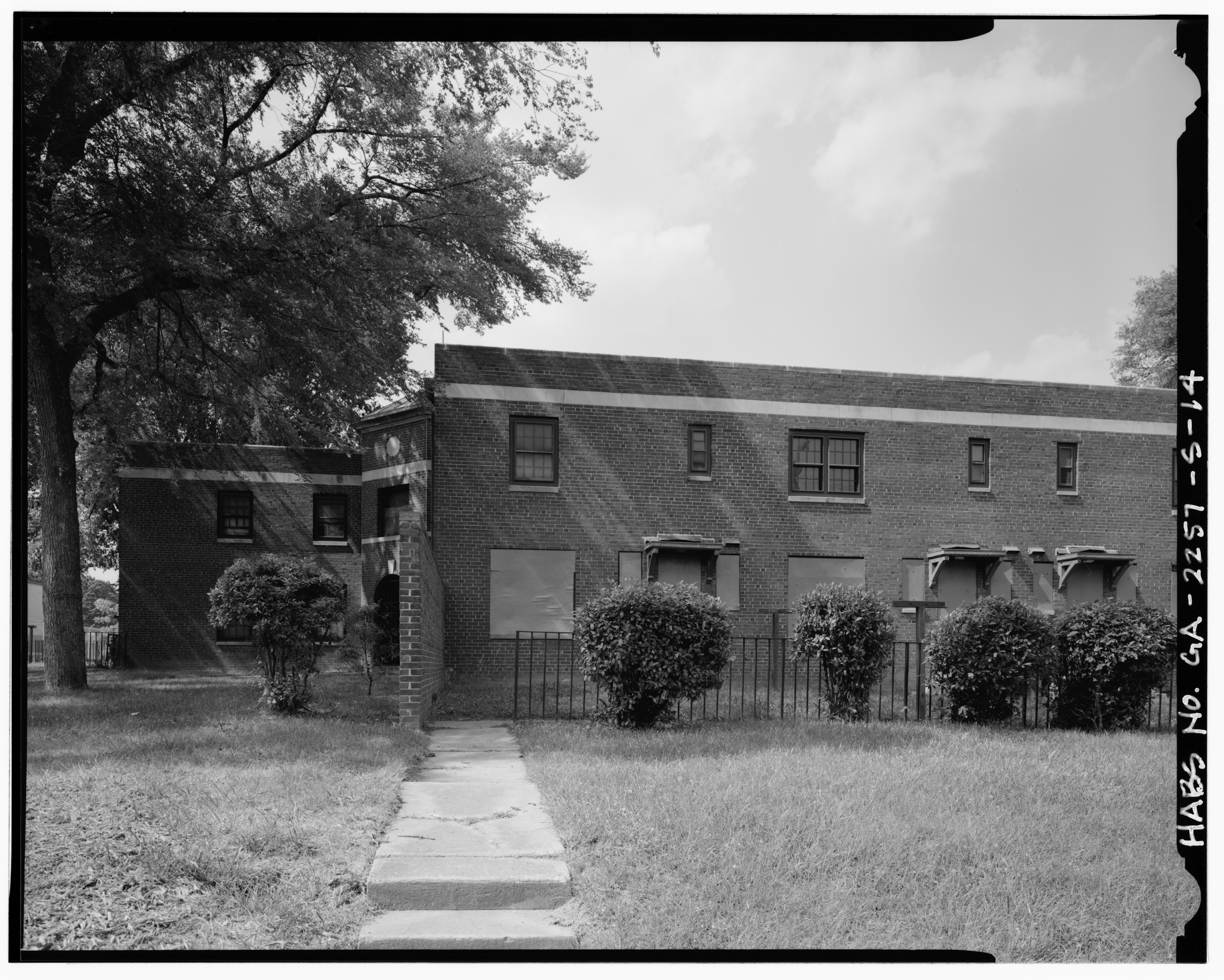
Techwood Homes, Building No. 16, Atlanta, Georgia.

Edith Harrison Henderson (1911–2005) was an American landscape architect who practiced largely in the American South. She wrote a column for the Atlanta Journal Constitution and was the first woman to be elected an officer of the American Society of Landscape Architects.

== Early life and education ==
Edith Harrison was born June 9, 1911, in Charlotte, North Carolina. Her family moved to Atlanta, Georgia, in 1925. In 1934, she graduated from the Lowthorpe School of Landscape Architecture in Massachusetts and in the same year received her bachelor of science degree from Boston's Simmons College, which at the time was affiliated with the Lowthorpe School.

In 1939, Harrison married Army Captain James Henderson (1913–2013). The couple had three children, a daughter, Grey, and two sons, Edward and James Ross.

== Career ==
After college, Edith moved back to Atlanta, where she opened her own practice with fellow landscape architect Grace Campbell. In 1936, she took a job as director of the new Rich's Department Store Garden Center. In 1938, with her private practice increasing, she left the position.

During a career that spanned five decades, Henderson consulted with thousands of clients on projects ranging from private gardens to churches and public projects. She eventually obtained landscape architect's licenses in six states. Her most notable project may be the landscaping of the Techwood Homes, the nation's first public housing project, completed in 1936. Of this project, she later observed,

We set it up so the entire design plan would be a green one, that in various times of the year there would always be something in leaf color or in flower. The housing ... [was to be] absorbed inside the city as if it were a park ... a part of the regular life of the entire city, ... [the setting] so carefully done that it would be pleasing to everyone and would fit in well.

In 1939, she and Campbell were invited to develop the landscape plan for the neighboring Clark Howell Homes, another public housing project in Atlanta. Other prominent projects include the grounds of the Metropolitan Atlanta Rapid Transit Authority (MARTA) and the First Presbyterian Church of Atlanta. A Memory Garden she designed for the church takes the form of an angel with outstretched wings, when viewed from above.

In 1940, Henderson started writing a weekly gardening column for the Atlanta Journal-Constitution that ran until the late 1970s. In addition to offering practical advice for gardeners, Henderson would write about her own projects as case studies. Henderson also occasionally wrote for Veranda and Southern Accents magazines.

In the late 1950s, Henderson worked with the state of Georgia to develop a new authority, the Board of Landscape Architects of Georgia, that would license landscape architects who passed an examination.

Henderson received numerous civic awards and an honorary bachelor's degree from the Rhode Island School of Design (which had absorbed the Lowthorpe School in 1945). In 1971, the Garden Club of America honored Henderson with the Oakleigh Thorne Medal of Excellence in Landscape Architecture. A member of the American Society of Landscape Architects since 1955, in 1976 she was elected its vice-president, thereby becoming the first woman to serve as an officer of the society. She went on to serve on the society's board and to chair its Council of Fellows.

Towards the end of her career, Henderson published books on gardening, including The Peachtree Garden Book: A Month-by-Month Guide for Lawn & Garden Care in the Southeast (1982) and Edith Henderson's Home Landscape Companion (1993).

Henderson was diagnosed with Alzheimer's disease in 1995 and died of complications from the disease in Atlanta on October 12, 2005. Her papers are held in the Kenan Research Center of the Atlanta History Center. The Landscape Architecture Foundation has established a scholarship in her name, the Edith H. Henderson Scholarship for students of landscape architecture.

== Books ==
Henderson, Edith. Edith Henderson's Home Landscape Companion. Peachtree Publishers, 1993
