= Vertical file =

Collection of grey literature

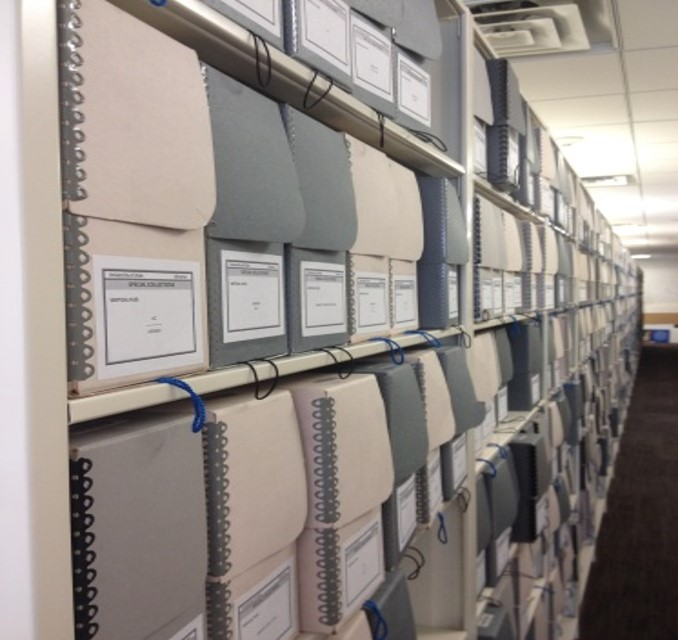
Vertical Files Boxes in Special Collections at the University of Utah Library

A vertical file (sometimes referred to as a clippings file or pamphlet file) is a collection of material, such as correspondence, news clippings, booklets, maps, pictures, pamphlets, tourism brochures, or other grey literature, created and maintained by businesses, libraries and other organizations. The materials are typically loose, separate pieces filed on edge and organized in folders often with tabs or guides and arranged most often alphabetically by subject. Vertical files are used as ready reference material to supplement other collections on topics not easily covered by conventional material such as books. The name comes from the fact that these collections are often stored in the vertical style of filing cabinets (as opposed to the lateral).

Prior to the advent of vertical filing, correspondence was often filed in pigeonhole files, spike or spindle files, box files, bellows files, and flat files. The first vertical file was made in 1892 and shown in 1893, at the Chicago World's Fair by the Library Bureau.

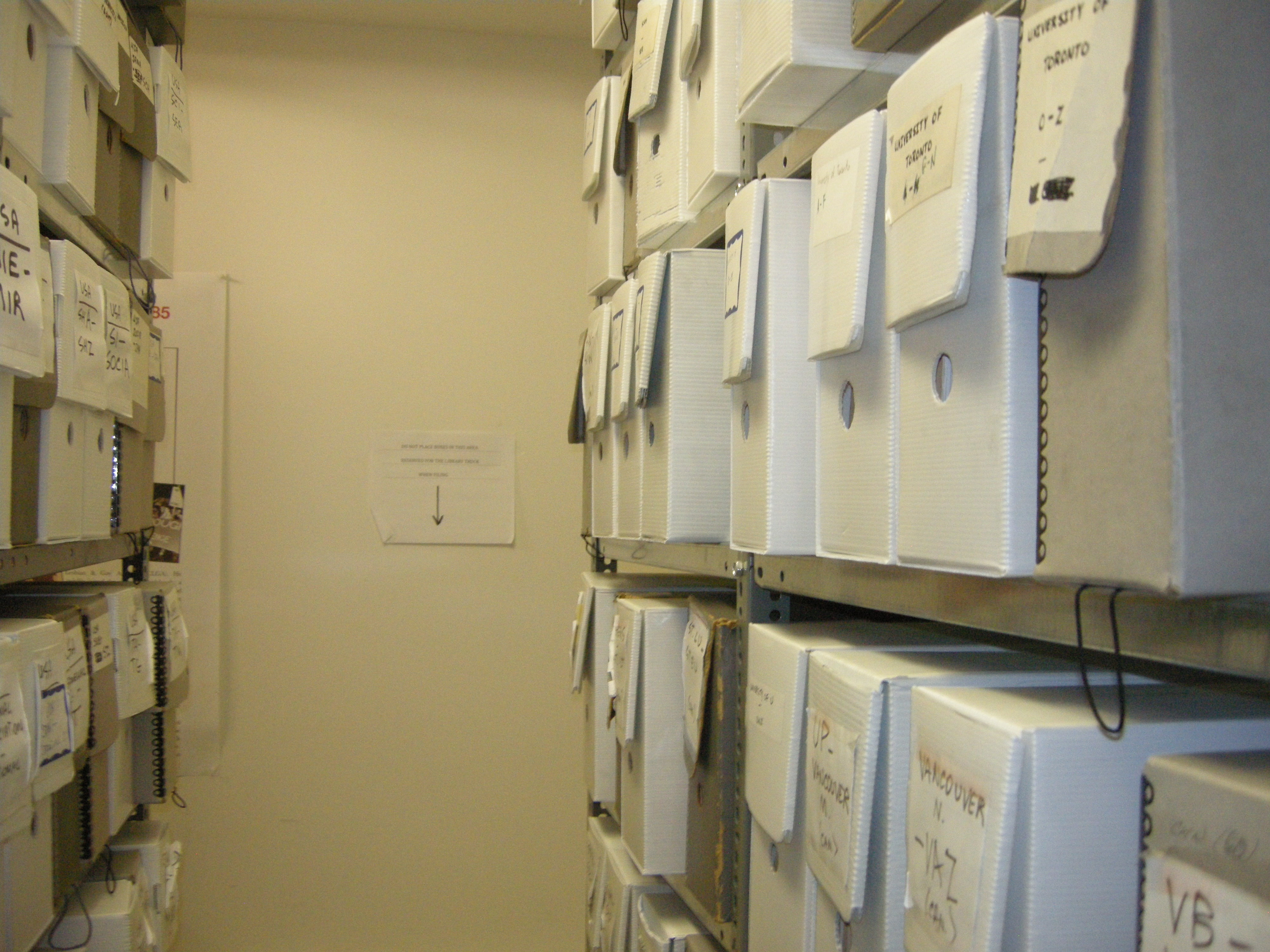
A wall of vertical files

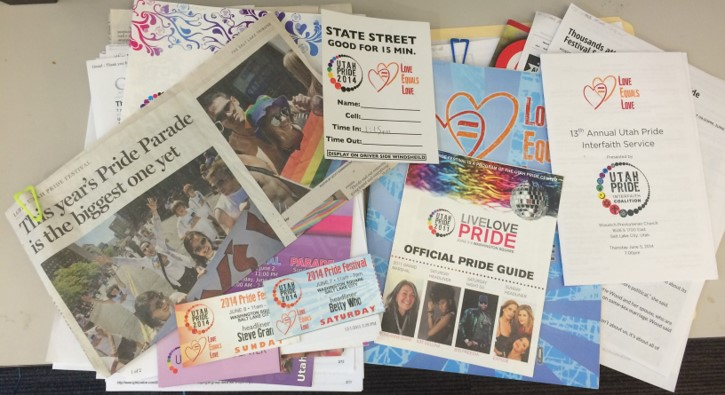
"Utah Pride Festival 1977-2015" Vertical File located within the Special Collections Library at the University of Utah Library

Vertical files have been manufactured since at least the early 1900s, however, their use and maintenance have waned in recent years due to the availability of information on the web.

The vertical file is related to the picture file, which is a collection of similar nature except that the contents are primarily images.
