= Lord & Schryver =

- Industry: Landscape architecture
- Founded: 1929; 96 years ago
- Founders: Elizabeth Blodget Lord; Edith Schryver
- Defunct: 1969
- Headquarters: Salem, Oregon, United States

Lord & Schryver was the first landscape architecture firm run by women in the Pacific Northwest. It was founded by Elizabeth Blodget Lord and Edith Schryver. It was headquartered in Salem, Oregon, running from 1929 to 1969. The firm designed more than 200 gardens.
