= Stanley White =

Stanley White may refer to:

- Stanley White (cricketer) (1910-1981), South African cricketer
- Stanley White (Year of the Dragon), a character from the novel and film Year of the Dragon
- Stanley Hart White (1891–1979), professor of landscape architecture
