= Myrtle Edwards =

Myrtle Edwards may refer to:

- Myrtle Edwards (sportswoman)
- Myrtle Edwards (politician)

== See also ==
- Myrtle Edwards Park, Seattle, Washington
