= Florence Bell Robinson =

American educator in landscape architecture

- Born: November 1, 1885; Lapeer, Michigan, U.S.
- Died: August 13, 1973 (aged 87)

Academic background
- Education: Kalamazoo College

Academic work
- Discipline: Landscape architecture
- Institutions: University of Illinois at Urbana–Champaign

Florence Bell Robinson (November 1, 1885 – August 13, 1973) was a prominent American educator in landscape architecture and a pioneer in introducing women into the field.

== Life ==
Born in Lapeer, Michigan, Robinson received her undergraduate degree in science from Kalamazoo College in 1908, and the BArch and MID (Master in Landscape Design) in 1924 from the University of Michigan. She ran her own landscape firm from 1916 to 1926 and worked as a draftsperson for J.W. Case in Detroit.

She arrived at the University of Illinois, Urbana-Champaign in 1926 and spent the rest of her career there, developing a highly ranked landscape architecture department with colleagues Stanley White and Karl Lohmann. In 1926 she was hired as associate teacher, then in 1929 she was hired as the first female tenure track faculty member. In 1949 she was promoted to associate professor, then in 1951 she was made full professor in the Department of Landscape Architecture. She retired in 1953. In addition to teaching she also maintained her own practice. An expert in the area of plants and planting design, she published and lectured extensively, and developed a plant cataloging system for educating students that was later published. She died in Hendersonville, North Carolina in 1973 after suffering a stroke.

Many of her students went on to play a prominent role in the field of landscape architecture, including Hideo Sasaki, Peter Walker, and Richard Haag.

== Publications ==
- Robinson, Florence Bell: Useful Trees and Shrubs (Champaign, IL: Garrard Press, 1938)
- Robinson, Florence Bell: Planting Design (New York and London: Whittlesey House, McGraw-Hill Book Co., 1940)
- Robinson, Florence Bell: Tabular Keys for the Identification of the Woody Plants (Champaign, IL: Garrard Press, 1941)
- Robinson, Florence Bell: Landscape Planting for Airports. (Urbana, Univ. of Illinois, 1948)
- Robinson, Florence Bell: Palette of Plants: Sequel to Planting Design (Champaign, IL: Garrard Press, 1950)
