= College of Fine and Applied Arts (University of Illinois Urbana-Champaign) =

Art school of the University of Illinois at Urbana-Champaign

Coordinates: 40°6′12.1″N 88°13′44.7″W

- Type: Public
- Established: 1867
- Dean: Kevin Hamilton
- Faculty: 233
- Students: 2,371
- Undergraduates: 1,574
- Postgraduates: 797
- Location: Champaign, Illinois, United States
- Website: faa.illinois.edu

The College of Fine and Applied Arts (FAA) is a multi-disciplinary art school at the University of Illinois Urbana-Champaign.

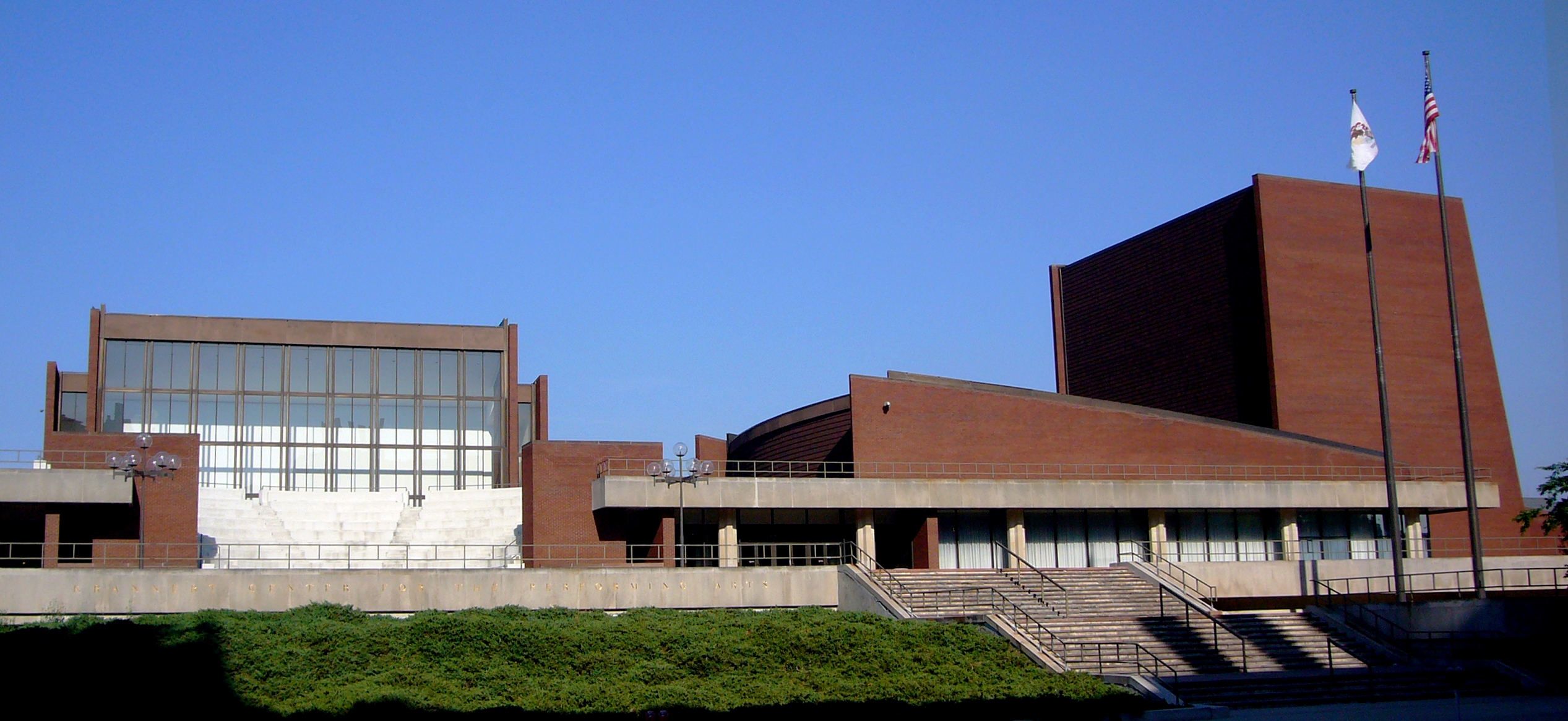
Krannert Center for the Performing Arts

== History ==
On October 3, 1921, a proposal was made by the University Senate to organize the Department of Architecture, the Division of Landscape Architecture, the School of Music and the Department of Art and Design into a College of Fine Arts. A committee, made up of faculty members, was appointed in 1928 to make recommendations, which were approved by the Senate on February 2, 1930. On March 12, 1931, the Board of Trustees established the college for the "cultivation of esthetic taste on the part of the student body at large ... and development of general artistic appreciation." The first dean was appointed in 1932.

Today, the college includes the Schools of Architecture, Art + Design, and Music; the Departments of Dance, Landscape Architecture, Theatre, and Urban + Regional Planning; Japan House; the Krannert Art Museum; the Krannert Center for the Performing Arts; and Sinfonia da Camera, the university's resident chamber orchestra. The college offers exhibitions, concerts, performances, lectures, master classes, and conferences in all areas of the performing and visual arts and for the designed and built environment.

=== Department of Urban + Regional Planning ===
The University of Illinois has a history in the training of urban and regional planners, dating back to 1913 when Charles Mulford Robinson was appointed Professor of Civic Design in the university's Landscape Architecture Division. At that time, only the University of Illinois and Harvard University offered courses in urban planning. In 1945 the university authorized a master's degree in urban planning, and in 1953 an undergraduate degree was established. Both programs were offered in the Department of Landscape Architecture until 1965, when the Department of Urban Planning became its own academic unit. The department established the PhD in Regional Planning in 1983.

The Department of Urban and Regional Planning is one of the planning programs in the U.S., and it is one of very few programs that offers three degrees: a Bachelor of Arts in Urban Planning, a Master of Urban Planning, and a Doctor of Philosophy in Regional Planning. It also offers a Minor in Urban Planning, as well as joint master's degree options, including with Law, Architecture, and Business Administration.

=== Department of Landscape Architecture ===
This department is rated nationally among the top fifteen programs. It offers a BLA, MLA, and PhD program. The department also offers the Cherie Kluesing Fellowship, fellowship awarded to an entering graduate student with an interest in integrating fine arts in landscape design.

== Academic units and majors ==
- University of Illinois School of Architecture
- School of Art + Design
  - Art Education
  - Art History
  - Graphic Design
  - Industrial Design
  - Crafts: Metal/jewelry
  - New Media
  - Painting
  - Photography
  - Sculpture
- Department of Dance
- Department of Landscape Architecture
- Department of Theatre
  - Acting
  - Scenic Design and Technology
  - Sound Design
  - Lighting Design and Technology
  - Costume Design and Technology
  - Stage Management
  - Theatre Studies
- School of Music
  - Composition/Theory
  - Conducting
  - Jazz Studies
  - Performance
  - Music Education
  - Musicology
  - Piano Pedagogy
  - Music Technology
- Department of Urban and Regional Planning
- Sustainable Design Program
- Minors Include:
  - Art and Design
  - Architecture
  - Music
  - Landscape Architecture
  - Urban Planning
  - Theatre
  - Community Art Education
  - Art History

== College facilities ==
- Architecture Building
- Architecture East Annex One
- Art + Design Building
- Art East Annex Two
- Building Research Council (BRC)
- Dance Studio
- Erlanger House, Urbana, Illinois
- Flagg Hall
- Harding Band Building
- Japan House
- Krannert Art Museum
- Krannert Center for the Performing Arts
- Music Building
- Mumford Hall
- Noble Hall
- Smith Memorial Hall
- South Studios
- Temple Hoyne Buell Hall

== Notable alumni ==
- Max Abramovitz, B.S. 1929, architect of the Avery Fisher Hall of Lincoln Center and Assembly Hall on the Illinois campus
- Temple Hoyne Buell, B.S., 1916
- Henry Bacon, 1884, architect of the Lincoln Memorial in Washington D.C.
- Mark Staff Brandl, B.F.A., 1978, artist and art historian
- Betsy Brandt, actress, most famous for role as Marie Schrader on Breaking Bad
- Jeanne Gang, B.S., 1986, founder and principal of the Chicago architecture firm Studio Gang
- Nathan Gunn, B.M.E., 1994, Grammy Award-winning operatic baritone
- Jerry Hadley, M.F.A., Grammy Award-winning operatic tenor
- Ralph Johnson, B.Arch, 1971, principal architect of the Perkins+Will
- Cherie Kluesing, M.L.A., landscape architect
- Ang Lee, B.A. 1980, Academy Award-winning movie director (Best Director, Life of Pi, Brokeback Mountain)
- Nick Offerman, B.F.A., Theatre, 1993, actor
- César Pelli, M.Arch., 1954, architect of Petronas Twin Towers in Kuala Lumpur, Malaysia
- Chitra Ramanathan, B.F.A Painting 1993, M.B.A 1997, Artist and educator
- Nathan Clifford Ricker, D.Arch. 1873, architecture educator
- Alan Ruck, B.F.A., Theatre, 1979, actor
- Jay Ryan, B.F.A. 1994, artist and rock musician
- Carolee Schneemann, M.F.A., artist
- William Wegman, M.F.A., 1967, Art and Design, visionary video artist, photographer, conceptualist and author
