= Stanley Hart White =

American professor and architect (1891–1979)

- Born: February 15, 1891; Brooklyn, New York
- Died: 1979; Denver, Colorado
- Education: Cornell University; Harvard University
- Occupations: Landscape architect, professor
- Employer: University of Illinois Urbana-Champaign
- Known for: Inventor of the green wall, Modernized Landscape Architecture
- Spouse: Blanche Bigney
- Children: Janice Hart White; born March 6, 1918, died September 8, 2002

Stanley Hart White (1891–1979) was a professor of University of Illinois Department of Landscape Architecture from 1922 to 1959 and the inventor of the green wall.

== Career ==
White called his invention "Botanical Bricks" and developed prototypes in his backyard in Urbana, Illinois. Stanley's brother E.B. White documented the invention in his 1937 letter to Katherine S. White, writing, “I guess everyone has crazy brothers and sisters. I know I have. Stan, by the way, has taken out a patent on an invention of his called ‘Botanical Bricks,’ which are simply plant units capable of being built up to any height, for quick landscape effects, the vertical surfaces covered with flowering vines, or the like. He thinks that the idea has great possibilities for such things as world fairs, city yards, indoor gardens, and many other projects. I think perhaps he has got hold of something, and have written him for more information. He certainly deserves a break.”

Stanley refined the vertical garden typology with his patent for the "vegetation-Bearing Architectonic Structure and System (1938)" in which he outlined the scope for a new field of vegetation-bearing architecture. The impact of this invention has still unrealized provocations on this history of gardens and designed landscapes, establishing precedent for verdant modernism in the prewar Middle West. The wall was reconstructed in 2012-13 as part of a Graham Foundation Research Award.

Stanley Hart White is also known for his innovative teaching style and his influence on the work of Richard Haag, Hideo Sasaki, Peter Walker, Stu Dawson, Philip H. Lewis Jr., and numerous others.

== Personal life ==
Stanley Hart White married Blanche Bigney; they had one daughter, Janice Hart White, an accomplished artist. As E. B. White's niece, Janice was an inspiration for the title character in Stuart Little, Harper and Brothers, 1945.

== See also ==
- Florence Bell Robinson
