= Fry Street Quartet =

- Origin: Logan, Utah, U.S.
- Genres: Classical · chamber
- Years active: 1997–present
- Members: Robert Waters; Rebecca McFaul; Bradley Ottesen; Anne Francis Bayless
- Past members: William Fedkenheuer

The Fry Street Quartet (FSQ) is an American string quartet in residence at the Caine College of the Arts at Utah State University. They perform at festivals and venues around the world, earning numerous awards in the process.

The Fry Street Quartet formed in 1997, naming itself after their first rehearsal space in Chicago. Fry Street's list of accomplishments includes the Millennium Grand Prize at the 2000 Fischoff Competition, the largest chamber music competition in the world. The quartet debuted at Carnegie Hall in 2001 and has won awards at the Yellow Springs Competition and the Banff International String Quartet Competition, among others. They were hailed by The New York Times as "a triumph of ensemble playing."

When not traveling, each member of the quartet teaches full-time in the strings program at Utah State University. The quartet plays and practices at the Performance Hall on campus. Prior to coming to USU in 2002, the group was in residence in Hickory, North Carolina.

== Members ==
- First violin: Robert Waters (replacing William Fedkenheuer),
- Second violin: Rebecca McFaul
- Viola: Bradley Ottesen
- Cello: Anne Francis Bayless
