= Gas Works Park =

Public park in Seattle, United States

Coordinates: 47°38′46″N 122°20′06″W

- U.S. National Register of Historic Places
- U.S. Historic district
- Seattle Landmark
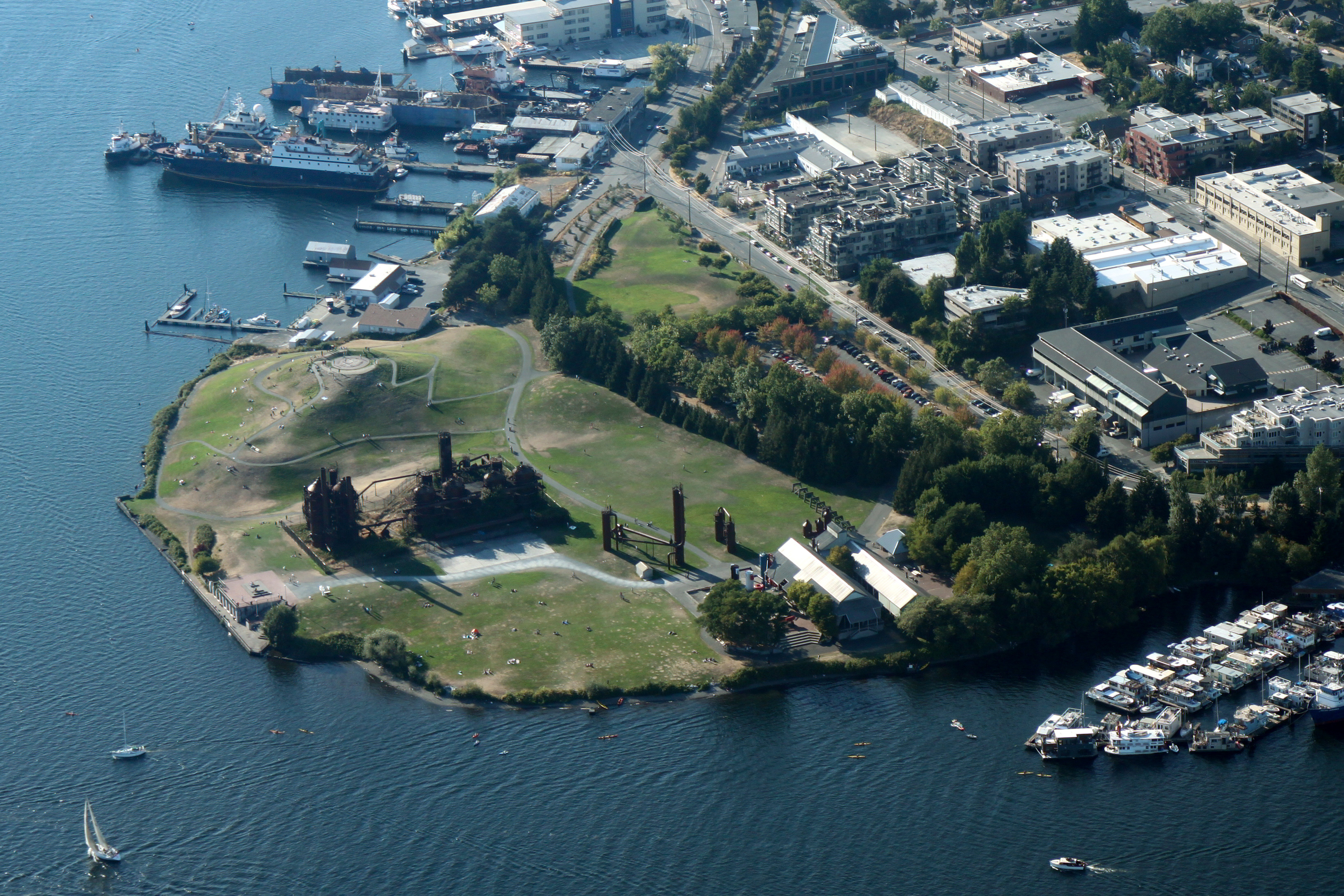
- The park seen in 2011

- Location within Washington (state) Location within the United States
- Location: 2000 N. Northlake Way, Seattle, Washington, U.S.
- Area: 20.5 acres (8.3 ha)
- Built: 1975
- Architect: Haag, Richard Haag; Jefferies-Norton Corp
- Architectural style: Post-industrial
- NRHP reference No.: 02000862
- Added to NRHP: January 2, 2013

Gas Works Park is a park located in Seattle, Washington, United States. It has a 19.1-acre (77,000 m^{2}) public park on the site of the former Seattle Gas Light Company gasification plant, located on the north shore of Lake Union at the south end of the Wallingford neighborhood. The park was added to the National Register of Historic Places on January 2, 2013, over a decade after being nominated.

Gas Works Park contains remnants of the sole remaining coal gasification plant in the United States. The plant operated from 1906 to 1956 and was bought by the city of Seattle for use as a park in 1962. The park opened to the public in 1975. It was designed by Seattle landscape architect Richard Haag, who won the American Society of Landscape Architects Presidents Award of Design Excellence for the project. The plant's conversion into a park was completed by Daviscourt Construction Company of Seattle. It was originally named Myrtle Edwards Park, after the city councilwoman who had spearheaded the drive to acquire the site, who died in a car crash in 1969. In 1972, the Edwards family requested that her name be removed from that of the park because the design called for the retention of the plant. In 1976, Elliott Bay Park (just north of Seattle's Belltown neighborhood) was renamed Myrtle Edwards Park.

Since 2008, the park's industrial towers have been the site of at least 14 documented fall-related incidents resulting in three deaths and numerous life-threatening injuries, prompting an ongoing legal and preservation dispute over whether to remove the structures' ladders, catwalks, and platforms.

== Overview ==
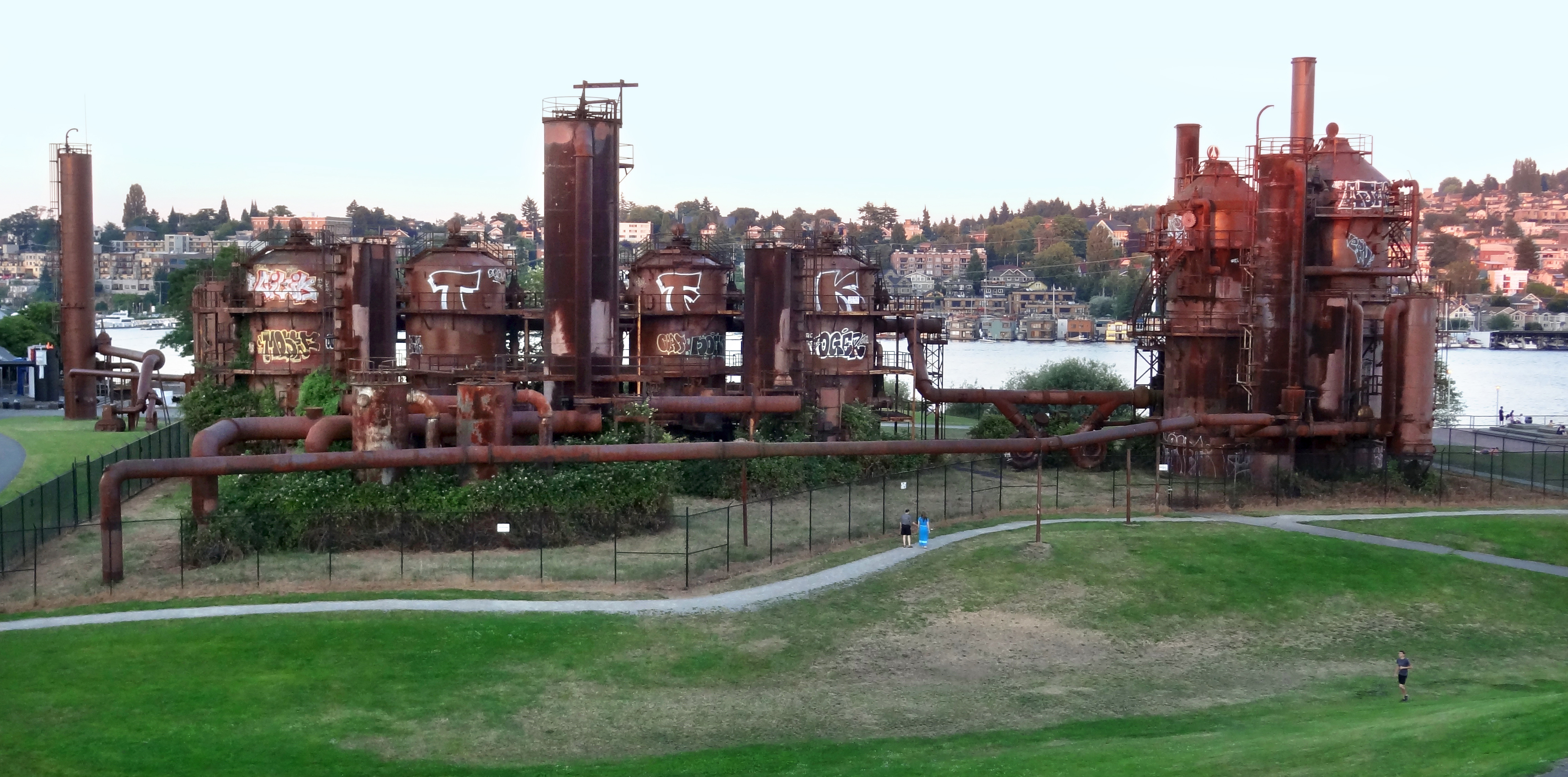
The old gasification plant.

Gas Works Park incorporates numerous pieces of the old plant. Some stand as ruins, while others have been reconditioned, painted, and incorporated into a children's "play barn" structure, constructed in part from what was the plant's exhauster-compressor building. A web site affiliated with the Seattle Times newspaper said, "Gas Works Park is easily the strangest park in Seattle and may rank among the strangest in the world."

Gas Works Park also features an artificial kite-flying hill with a sculptured sundial built into its summit. The park was for many years the exclusive site of a summer series of "Peace Concerts". These concerts are now rotated among several Seattle parks. The park also has for many years hosted one of Seattle's two major Independence Day fireworks events; in 2009, it was the sole such event. The park is the traditional end point of the Solstice Cyclists and the starting point for Seattle's World Naked Bike Ride.

The park originally constituted one end of the Burke–Gilman Trail, laid out along the abandoned right-of-way of the Seattle, Lake Shore and Eastern Railway. However, the trail has now been extended several miles northwest, past the Fremont neighborhood toward Ballard.

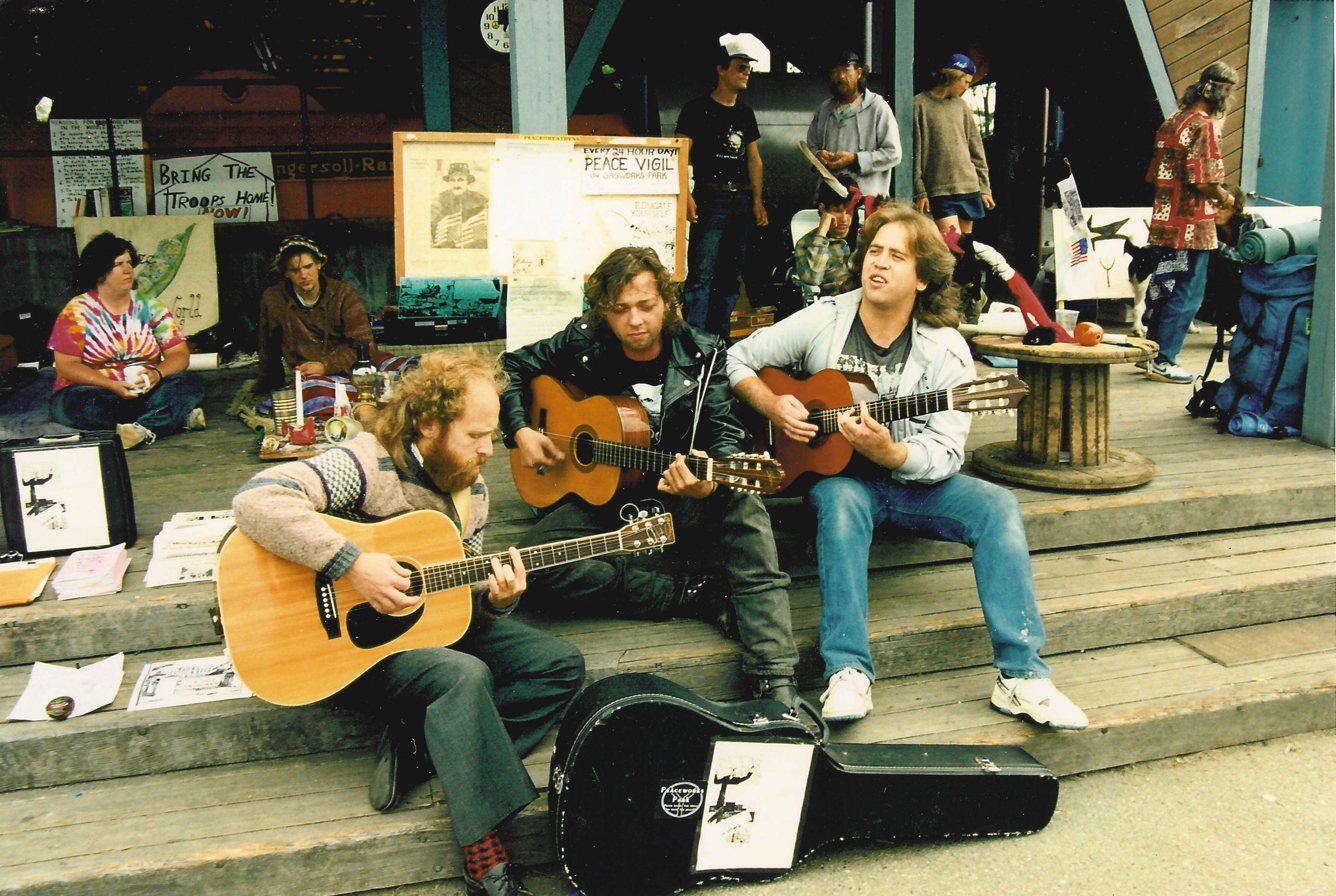
"PeaceWorks Park" anti-war protest at Gas Works, 1990

The soil and groundwater of the site was contaminated during its operation as a gasification plant. The 1971 Master Plan called for "cleaning and greening" the park through bio-phytoremediation. Although the presence of organic pollutants had been substantially reduced by the mid-1980s, the US Environmental Protection Agency and Washington State Department of Ecology required additional measures, including removing and capping wastes, and air sparging in the southeast portion of the site to try to remove benzene that was a theoretical source of pollutants reaching Lake Union via ground water. There are no known areas of surface soil contamination remaining on the site today, although tar occasionally still oozes from some locations within the site and is isolated and removed.

Despite its somewhat isolated location, the park has been the site of numerous political rallies. These included a seven-month continuous vigil under the name PeaceWorks Park, in opposition to the Gulf War. The vigil began at a peace concert in August 1990 and continued until after the end of the shooting war. Among the people who participated in the vigil were former congressman and future governor Mike Lowry, then-city-councilperson Sue Donaldson, 1960s icon Timothy Leary, and beat poet Allen Ginsberg.

Gas Works Park has been a setting for films such as Singles and 10 Things I Hate About You. It has been featured twice on the travel-based television reality show The Amazing Race: once as the Finish Line for Season 3 and another time as the starting line for Season 10. The park was the site of the 2021 NHL expansion draft for the Seattle Kraken.

The building is a Seattle city landmark and a Washington State landmark. In October of 2025, the parents of Mattheis Johnson filed a lawsuit to have the plant's towers declared a public nuisance. Earlier that year, 15-year old Johnson attempted to climb the towers and fell 50 feet to his death.

According to a letter submitted to the Seattle Landmark Review Committee by the Johnson family's attorney, the Seattle Fire Department and news reports document at least 14 fall-related injuries or deaths at the towers since 2008, far exceeding figures previously circulated by city officials. These include three fatalities (2012, 2022, and 2025), multiple incidents resulting in life-threatening head and internal injuries, brain injury, and numerous cases of multiple fractures. The letter argues that the ladders, catwalks, and platforms constitute a "nuisance per se" under Washington law (RCW 7.43.080) and notes that the City Parks Department had recommended their removal with detailed renderings, stating "public safety is paramount," but the Landmarks Preservation Board rejected the proposal in fall 2025, calling for further study despite the pattern of injuries spanning nearly two decades.

== History ==
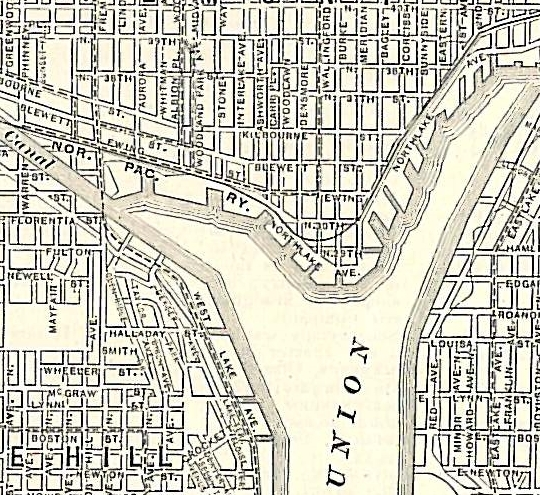
A 1911 map shows the promontory, near the center of the map. Many of the east–west street names have since changed, and a few near the lake have been somewhat rerouted.

Gas Works Park occupies a 20.5 acres (8.3 hectares) promontory between the northwest and northeast arms of Lake Union. Little is known of pre–Euro-American site history, but there were Native American settlements around Lake Union. Native names for Lake Union include Kah-chug, Tenas Chuck, and Xa'ten. In the mid-19th century Thomas Mercer named it "Lake Union" in expectation of future canals linking it to Puget Sound and to Lake Washington. Dense forests came to the water's edge and the lake drained into Salmon Bay through a stream "full of windfalls and brush, impassable even for a canoe". (Bass 1947, p. 33) Lake Union in the 1860–70s was a popular vacation spot with Seattleites for summer house-boating and picnicking.

Several sawmills were operating on Lake Union's shore by the 1850s, taking advantage of the dense forests. Beginning in 1872, Seattle Coal and Transportation Company ferried coal from its Renton Hill mines across the lake for portage across to Puget Sound. In the 1880s came the Denny sawmill at the south end of Lake Union, brick manufacturing, ship building, a tannery, and iron works. Canals with small locks were cut in 1885 from Lake Washington to Lake Union, and from Lake Union to Salmon Bay. These were suitable for transporting logs, but not for shipping. The arrival of the Seattle, Lake Shore and Eastern Railway in 1887 ensured that Lake Union would continue to be a focus for industrial development. In 1900 the Seattle Gas Light Company began to purchase lots on this promontory (Secrist, Title Search) and its coal gas plant went into operation in 1906. At the time the neighborhood was known as Edgewater (see map, Commons:File:Seattle map 1909.jpg.)

Seattle Gas Light Company purchased lots on the north shore promontory from 1900 to 1909. Despite the fact that the land was being acquired by the gas company, the Olmsted Brothers in 1903 recommended that "...the point of land between the northeast and northwest arms of Lake Union and the railroad should be secured as a local park, because of its advantages for commanding views over the lake and for boating, and for a playground." (Olmsted Brothers 1903, p. 47)

In 1911, Virgil Bogue produced a civic master plan for Seattle's Municipal Plans Commission in which he promoted the idea of Lake Union as an industrial area: "The fact that (Lake Union) is located in the very heart of the city indicates that if properly developed it will become a most important factor in the commercial and business activities of the city." (Seattle Municipal Plans Commission 1911, p. 78) Completion of the Lake Washington Ship Canal and Ballard Locks in 1917 guaranteed the success of shipping and shipbuilding industries on Lake Union and thus of the Bogue vision, despite the fact that his plan was defeated by voters.

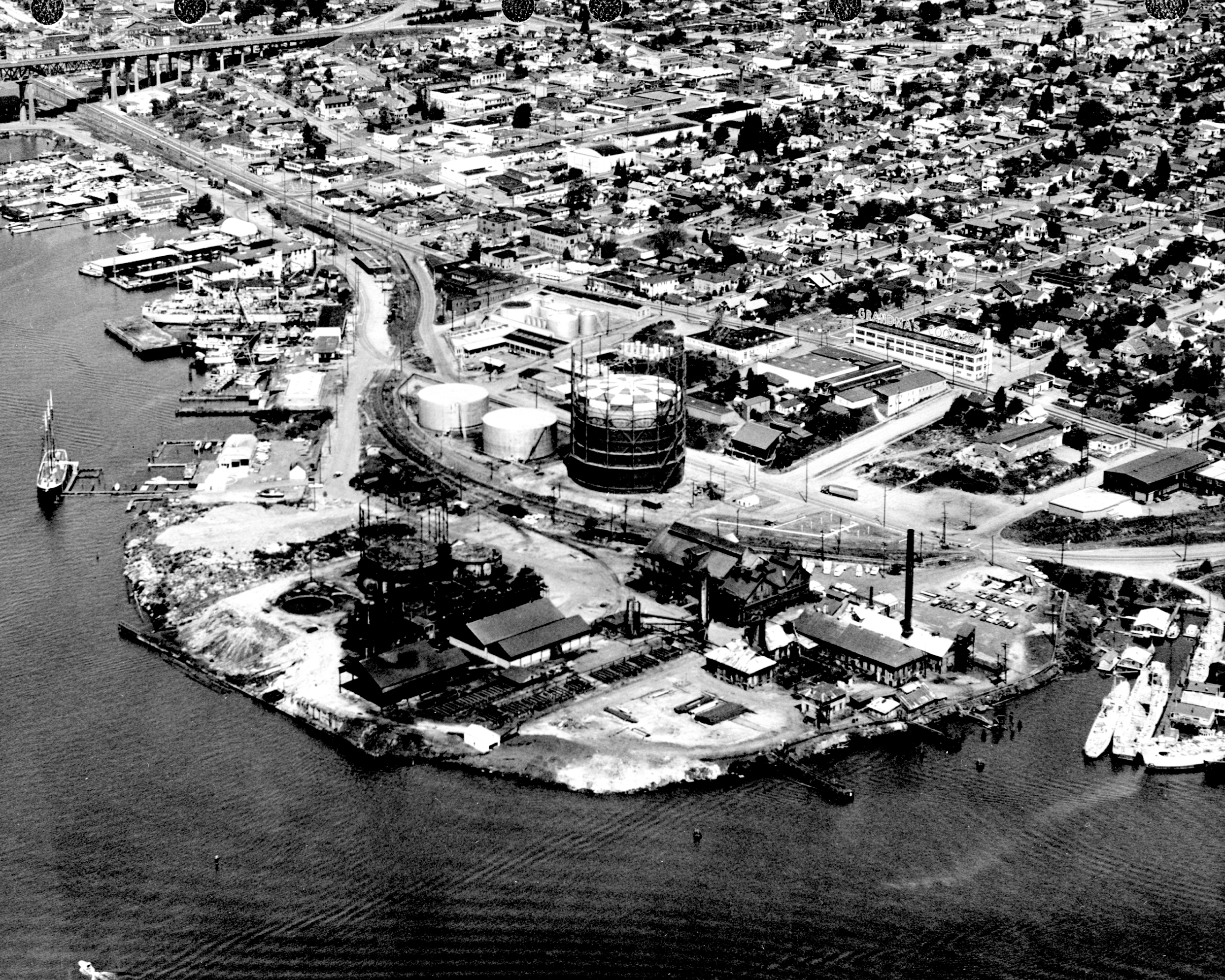
The mothballed gasworks, 1966.

The Lake Station gas manufacturing plant on Lake Union was the largest private utility then existing in Seattle. It operated as "Seattle Lighting Company" until 1930, when the name was changed to "Seattle Gas Company". Its primary product was illuminating gas (so-called because it was used for lighting) manufactured from coal. The gas was later also used for cooking, refrigeration, and heating homes and water. It was also called city gas to distinguish it from natural gas. The gas was made from coal up to 1937 when the high cost of operating the old coke oven and coal-gas generating sets forced a change-over to oil. A pair of oil-to-gas generators was built in 1937 and the old coal-gas facilities were disassembled. In 1946–47, two more oil gas generator pairs were constructed to keep up with demand for gas. Since by-products from gas manufacturing had strong markets of their own, new equipment was installed at the same time to produce "Gasco charcoal briquets", toluene, solvent naphtha, sulfur, xylene, and resin tar.

Primary manufacturing and support facilities consisted of storage tanks, boiler house, pump and compressors house, offices, and laboratories. Onsite support included electrical, carpentry, machine, blacksmith, and welding shops. Additional facilities included a stable, first aid stations, and a fire-safe house for storing fire control materials. Running through the north portion of the site was Burlington Northern Railroad's 50 ft (15 m)-wide right-of-way. Train trestles from the coal days were still in place in front of the laboratories and offices building.

By 1954, the Lake Station plant used 1,071 miles (1,724 km) of gas main to serve Seattle, Renton, Kent and Tukwila. The plant served approximately 43,198 customers in 1940, decreasing to 36,200 in 1954. The company averaged about 130 employees, with four crews of 23 men per shift, rotating 24 hours a day on a 7-day run. Production of city gas ended in 1956 when Seattle converted to natural gas.

Though gas production ceased in 1956, the buildings and manufacturing structures were still intact in 1962 when the city of Seattle began purchasing the abandoned gas works. The $1.34 million purchase price was provided by Forward Thrust bonds, HUD payments were made from 1962 to 1972, and the debt was retired.

The abandoned gas-production plant and its land were deeded to the city of Seattle in 1975 and Gas Works Park was opened to the public that same year.

== Park development and remediation efforts ==
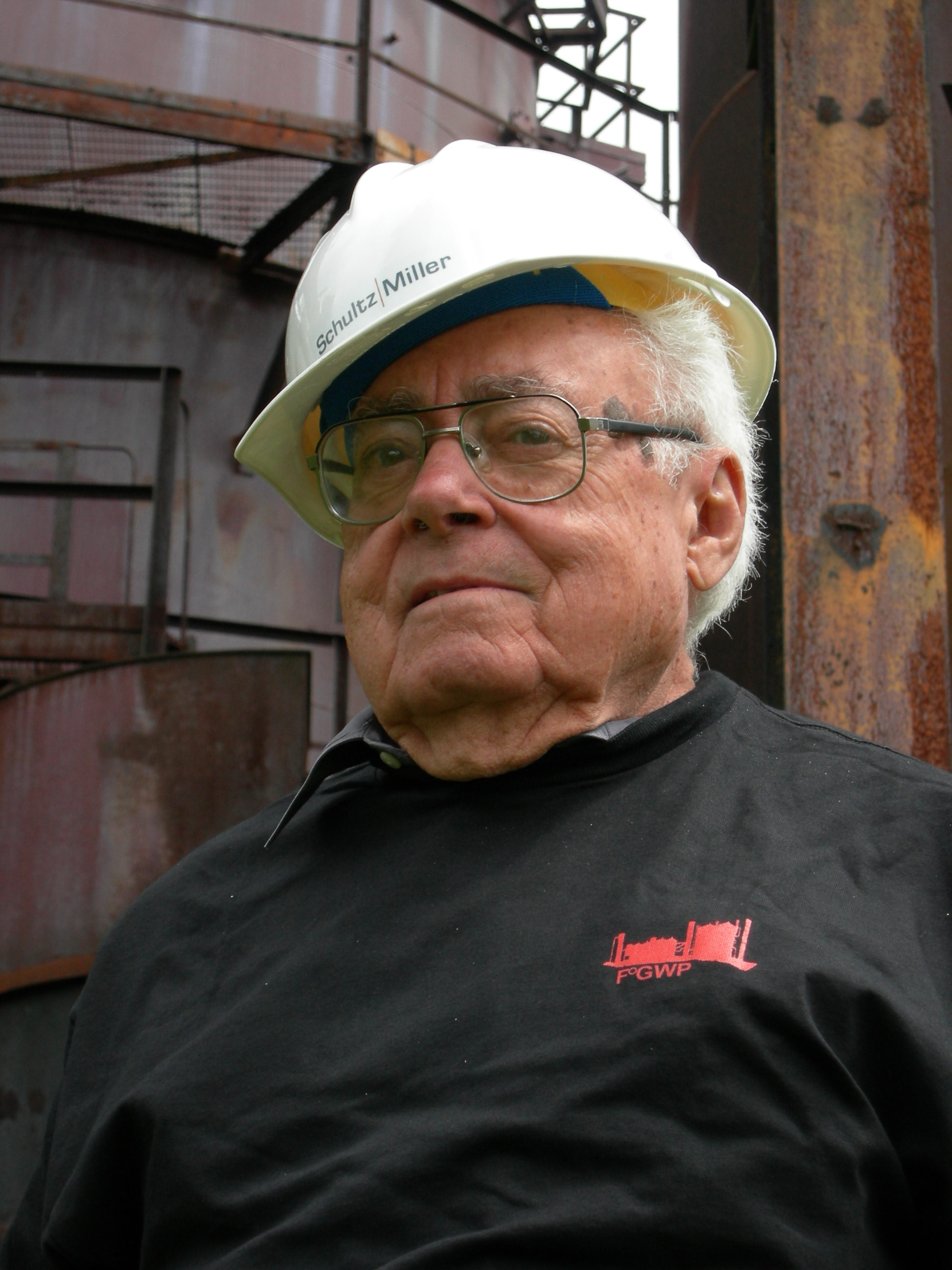
2007 photo of landscape architect Richard Haag, designer of the park

There was a considerable public discussion about whether the site should be developed or made into a park. Park advocates led by Myrtle Edwards prevailed. In 1970, Richard Haag Associates (RHA) were retained by the Seattle Park Board to perform a site analysis and master plan for a new park at the gas plant site. RHA opened an on-site office to research and analyze the plant site. Richard Haag realized that the site contained the last gas works and a unique opportunity for preservation. Haag recommended preservation of portions of the plant for its "historic, esthetic and utilitarian value". (Master Plan, April 1971) After an intense public appeal to convince the public of the value of the plant, RHA's 1971 master plan for an industrial preservation park was unanimously approved by the Park Board. The proposal centered on recycling the buildings, production structures, machinery, and even the grounds themselves. Through bio-phyto-remediation techniques, the soil and water would be "cleaned and greened". Through preservation and adaptive reuse of key structures, the rich history of the site and thus of an important aspect of Seattle would be preserved and revealed.

The Washington State Department of Ecology announced plans in 2022 to begin the final efforts in soil and shoreline remediation, comprising an estimated area of 50.0-acre (20.2 ha) surrounding the park. The cleanup is scheduled to begin in 2027 and will help to remove such contaminants as arsenic, carbazole, dibenzofuran and nickel. A successful decontamination may allow users official access to the waters of Lake Union from the park. The cleanup project is estimated to cost $73 million and would be funded by the city government with some costs reimbursed from the Department of Ecology.

=== Landscape architect ===
Gas Works Park is the work of its designer, Richard Haag, a Seattle landscape architect.

== Features ==
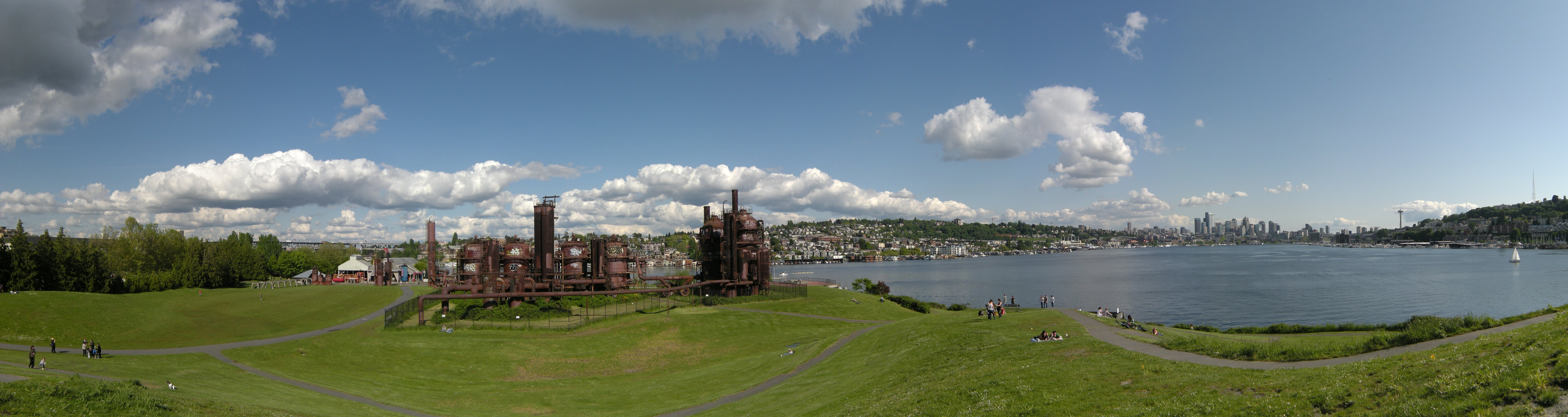
Panoramic view from the "Great Mound", showing much of the park and the view toward downtown Seattle.

The park site consists of 20.5 acres (83,000 m^{2}) of land projecting 400 feet (120 m) into Lake Union with 1,900 feet (580 m) of shoreline. The site is bordered by North Northlake Way at the north and abuts Lake Union on the east and south. The Wallingford neighborhood sits to the north. Immediately adjacent to the park are remnants of the industrial development of the area. The industrial dominance is rapidly being replaced by retail development. North of North 40th Street the area is predominantly a residential neighborhood.

The park is entered through a landscaped parking area or through the Burke-Gilman Trail, a bike and walking path that connects Puget Sound to Lake Washington. Dividing the parking area from the park is a grassy berm and rows of trees demarcating the old railroad right of way. The park is composed of seven areas: Earth Mound, North Lawn, Towers, Prow, Picnic Lawn and Shelter, Play Barn, and South Lawn. The Earth Mound, Prow, and Lawns are open areas intended for passive and active recreation and offer magnificent views. The Towers, Play Barn, and Picnic Shelter are adapted from the original manufacturing structures.

GWP was designed to be an urban, intensively used pleasure ground utilizing unique structures. "The traditional escape from the city into the sylvan settings of remote areas has changed for many people into a seeking of a more active encounter. Introspection and retreat are easily accomplished without physical isolation, but facilities for social interaction with persons other than intimate friends are more scarce with respect to population growth. ...new sites should be offered in a vast and varied park system to accommodate experimentation and innovation in both design and program." (Master Plan, 1971) Because of the Gas Plant structures and the attractive setting, GWP complements the rich heritage of Seattle's Post-Victorian parks and offers expanded programs in ways that the latter cannot. Throughout every year hundreds of thousands of people use GWP. They gather to celebrate Independence Day and watch fireworks. Concerts, kite-flying, jogging, public meetings, and the open space and views of the park itself are attractions that keep GWP in constant use.

However, there is no access to Lake Union. The lake’s sediment contains hazardous substances. Therefore, aquatic activities like swimming, boating, fishing and wading are prohibited.

=== The earth mound ===
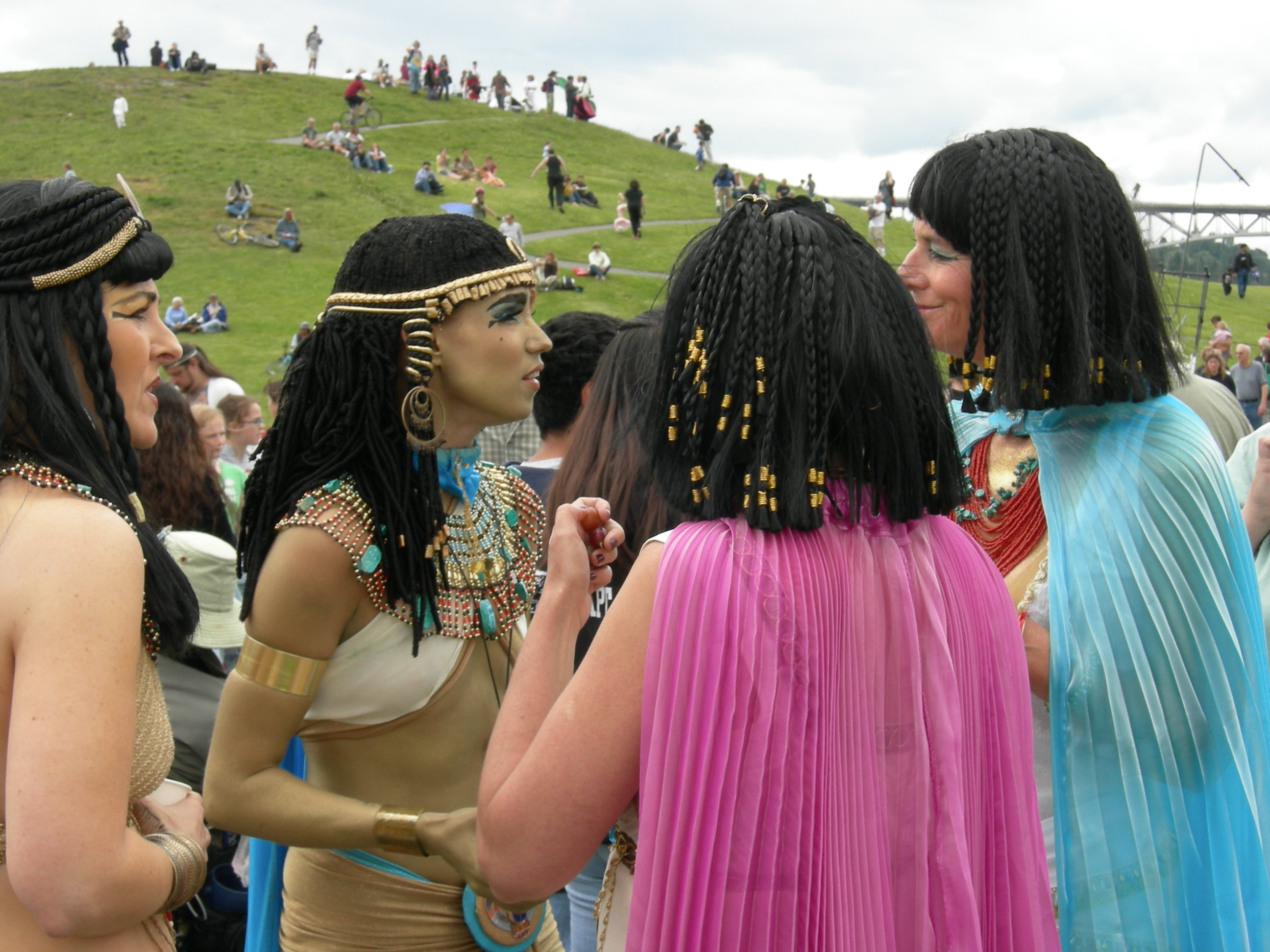
Summer Solstice pageant in the park, 2007. The earth mound is in the background.

Part of the master plan, known as the "Great Mound", hill was molded out of thousands of cubic yards of rubble from building foundations covered with fresh topsoil. The sundial at the top of the mound was created by two local artists, Chuck Greening and Kim Lazare. Formed out of concrete and delineated with rocks, shells, glass, bronze and many other materials, the sundial tells time by using the body of the visitor as the gnomon. The viewer's shadow tells the time of day and the season.

=== Lawn areas ===
The park contains several lawn areas. Soil has been bioremediated with 18" of sewage sludge and sawdust. This process has decontaminated the soil and allowed for the growth of field grass which makes possible constant, hard use with low maintenance.

=== Towers ===
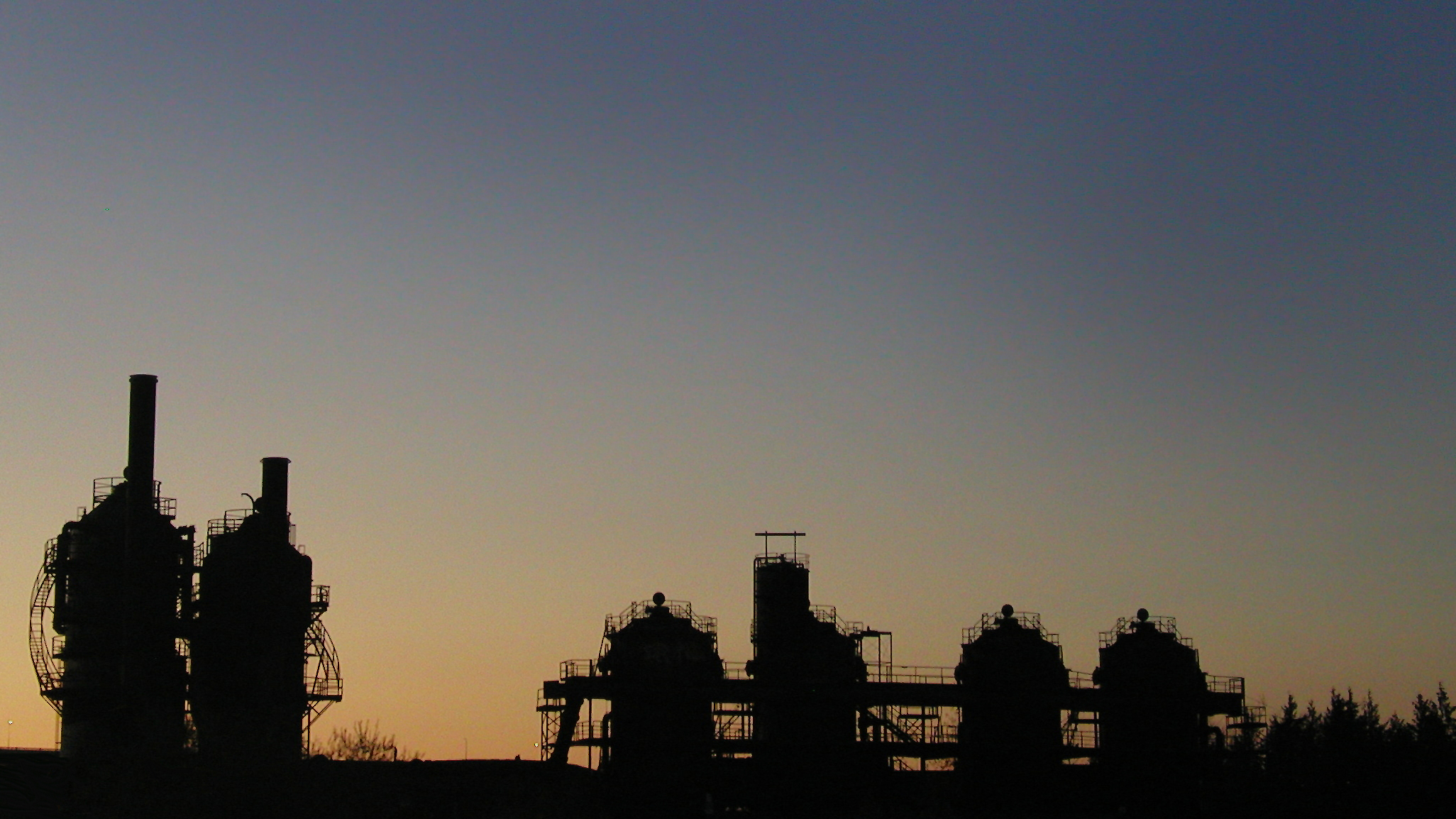
The towers silhouetted by a sunset, seen from the east

There are two groups: 1) six synthetic natural gas generator towers with their attendant processing towers, and 2) oil absorber and oil cooler (between the play barn and the generators). The generators operated in pairs and were built at different times.

(A): Towers 1 and 2 (largest and closest to the lake) are Semet-Solvay–type generators built in 1937–38. Each has a single outer shell made of welded steel lined inside with refractory brick. Tower 1 is 80 ft (24 m) and Tower 2 is 75 ft (23 m) tall. At their peak they could manufacture 6 million cubic feet (170,000 m^{3}) of gas a day.

B): Towers 3 and 4 were built in 1947, towers 5 and 6 (northernmost), in 1947. They have the same brick inner shell and welded-steel outer shell construction as Towers 1 and 2, but are smaller. All four towers have an outer diameter of 22 feet (6.7 m) and are 50 feet (15 m) tall. The brick liner has an inside diameter of 20 feet (6.1 m) and is 33 1/2 feet (10.2 m) high. The outer shells are equipped with nozzles for pipe and instrument connections, access doors, air blast doors, gas outlets, and sight holes. The towers rest on concrete pedestals. (Blueprints, 1945–46).

Wash boxes and scrubbers associated with generators 3-6 were also built in 1946–47. The small tanks (10 feet [3.0 m] diameter, 11 ft [3.4 m] tall, each mounted on three supporting legs) next to the generators are wash boxes, one per generator. For each pair of wash boxes there is one primary scrubber that rests on a concrete pedestal and stands 48 ft (15 m) tall (11.5 feet [3.5 m] diameter). The output from the two primary scrubbers goes into the single secondary scrubber of welded steel construction (12 feet [3.7 m] diameter, 68 ft [21 m] tall). Farthest from the generators are two small tanks (about 20 ft [6.1 m] tall) that were the original secondary scrubbers. All piping that connects these towers is of 3/16 inch (4.8 mm) plate steel. (Blueprints, 1945–46)

Between the generators and the play barn stand the oil absorber (80 feet) and cooler (40 feet). The cooling towers lowered the temperature of the light oil-gas mixture from the scrubbers, then the oils were separated from the gas in the oil absorber tower. The light oils were the secondary products benzene, toluene and solvent naphtha.

=== The prow ===
This concrete platform was built in 1936 as an unloading area for coal. The platform was integrated into the park design and handrails placed at the lakeside edges.

=== Play barn and picnic shelter ===
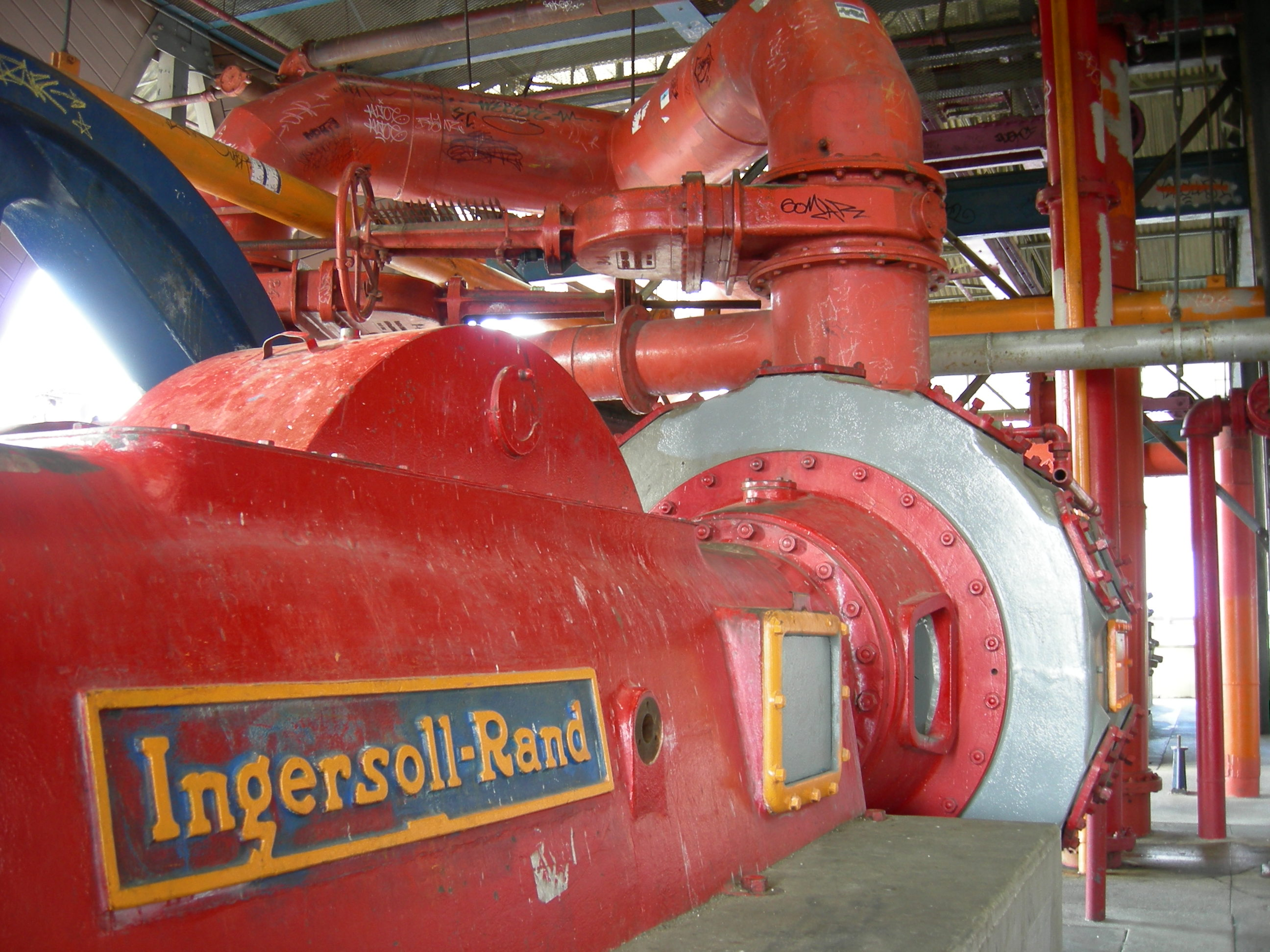
Inside the play barn, 2007

The buildings date back to the original coal-gas facility (ca 1910) and were constructed of wood. The pump house (also known as the exhauster house) is about 7,340 ft^{2} (682 m^{2}) and the boiler house is about 5,720 ft^{2} (531 m^{2}). The wood frames of both buildings remain intact and in place on concrete slab foundations.

The boiler house, now the picnic shelter, originally housed two boilers. One provided steam for the gasification process; the other provided steam for the steam engines that powered the pump house compressors. The tubes from one boiler remain in place at the eastern end of the building and are a display of seldom-seen industrial technology.

The pump house is now the play barn. Most of the pumps, compressors, and piping are still in place. The 3,000 hp (2,200 kW) compressor's 10 short tons (9.1 t) flywheel ran continuously to keep the plant operating 24 hours a day. In this building air was compressed for the oxygen-extraction process, the oxygen was then pumped to the generators for the first stage of gas manufacturing, and the final product was compressed and pumped to either the storage tank or down the lines of main to customers.

Outside the play barn, the sole surviving smoke arrestor hood has been refurbished as a play structure for climbing. Designed and built by the company in 1935, three were installed in order to reduce pollutant emissions.

Concrete train trestles now form a part of the GWP entrance. They were part of the original 1906 gas plant and ran along the north side of the office and laboratories building. Nothing remains of this building, but the trestles show where the train tracks ended and coal was delivered. Coal cars would ride up the trestles and release coal into hoppers parked under the trestles.

== Historical significance ==
The original structures are some of the last of their kind in existence. Paul Goldberger wrote in the New York Times that "Seattle is about to have one of the nation's most advanced pieces of urban landscape design. The complex array of towers, tanks and pipes of the gas works forms a powerful industrial still life ... serving both as a visual focus for the park and as a monument to the city's industrial past. The park represents a complete reversal from a period when industrial monuments were regarded, even by preservationists, as ugly intrusions on the landscape, to a time when such structures as the gas works are recognized for their potential ability to enhance the urban experience."

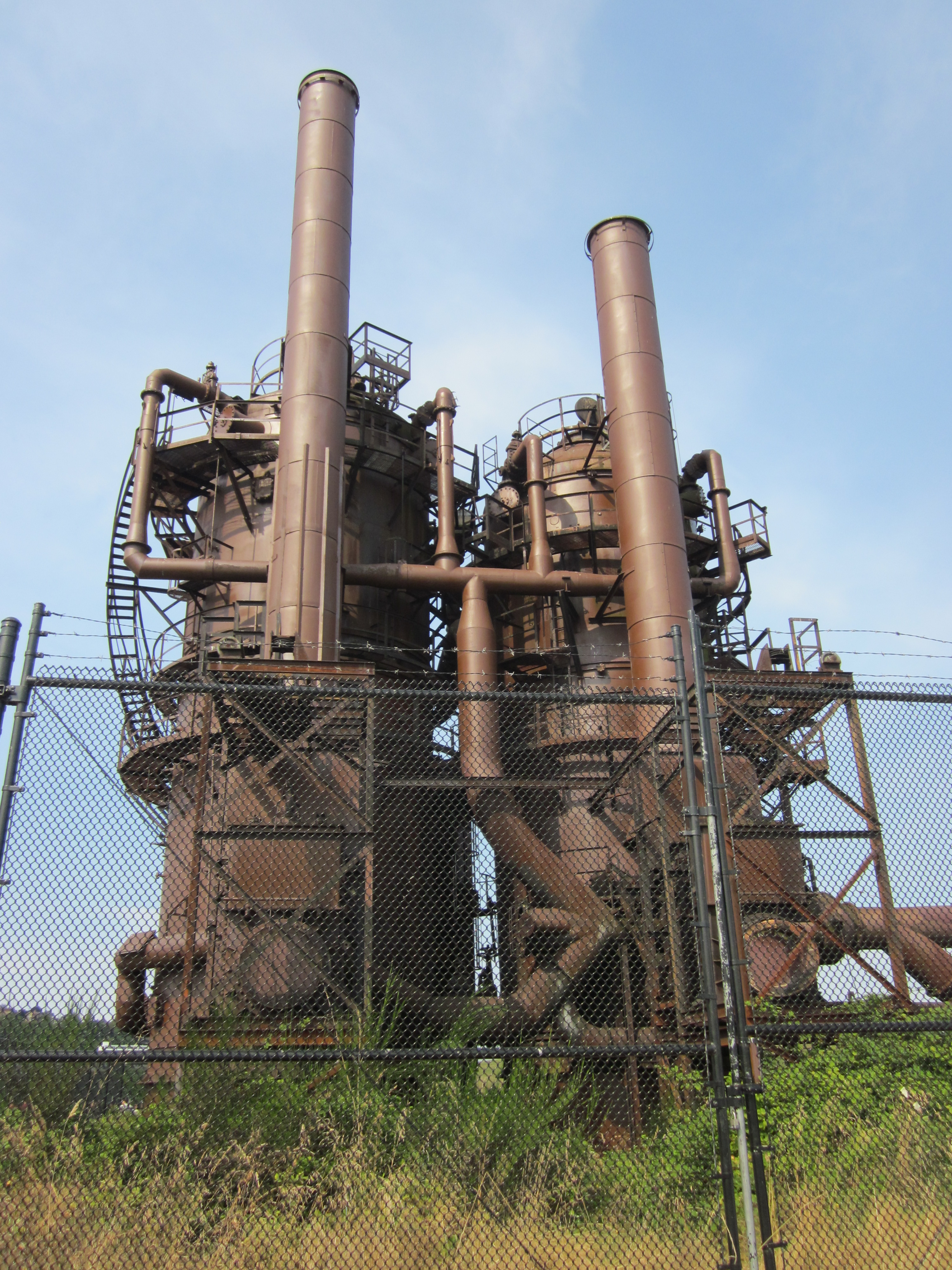
Two of the remaining towers

The Seattle Gas Company's production plant located on Lake Union, now Gas Works Park, was co-founded by one of Seattle's foremost pioneers, Arthur A. Denny. Throughout the first half of the twentieth century, the Gas Company was a significant participant in and contributor to the growth of Seattle and adjoining communities. Although its primary product was city gas for energy, the plant also manufactured other basic products necessary for urban growth: tar for roofing; lampblack for pigment in tires and ink; charcoal briquets for odor-free and efficient home heating; sulfur for insecticides, ammonium sulfate, and sulfuric acid; and toluene for use in explosives. Toluene was in high demand during World War II, and production of it was essential to the war effort (e.g., for making TNT and various types of gunpowder).

The impact of Gas Works Park on land reclamation and industrial preservation attitudes and techniques extends beyond Seattle. GWP has gained national and international standing as a prototype for industrial site conversions.

== Literature ==
- William S. Saunders (Ed.): Richard Haag. Bloedel Reserve and Gas Works Park. New York: Princeton Architectural Press 1998
- Pirzio-Biroli: "Adaptive re-use. Layering of meaning on sites of industrial ruin." in: Arcade journal 23/2004
- Udo Weilacher: Syntax of Landscape. Basel Berlin Boston: Birkhauser Publisher 2008. ISBN 978-3-7643-7615-4
