= Philip H. Lewis Jr. =

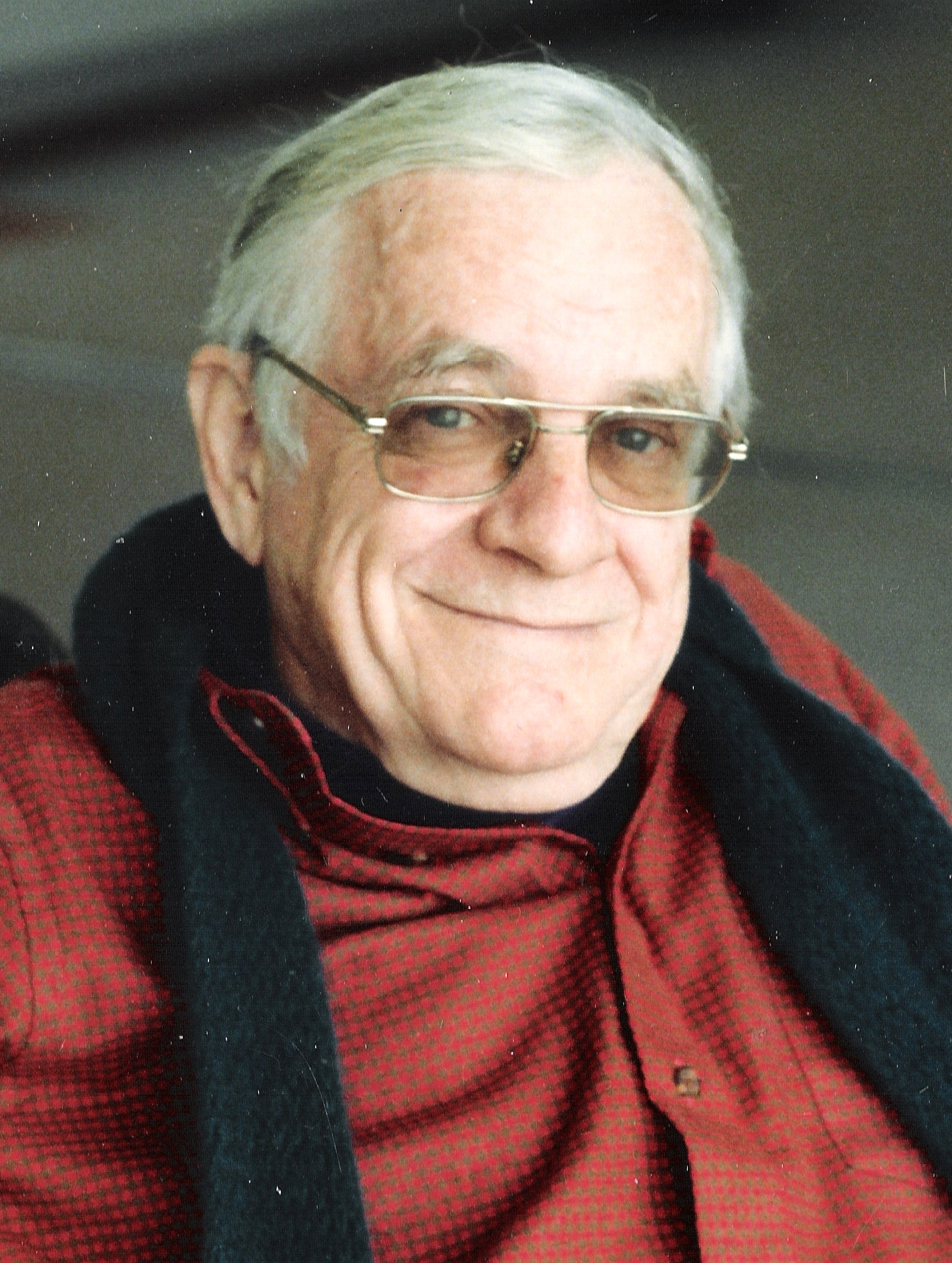
- Born: September 4, 1925; Robinson, Illinois
- Died: July 2, 2017 (aged 91); Madison, Wisconsin, U.S.
- Education: Harvard University & University of Illinois Urbana-Champaign
- Occupation: Landscape architect
- Spouse: Elizabeth Alice Thompson
- Children: Philip III, Andrew, Lisa

Philip Howard Lewis Jr. (September 4, 1925 – July 2, 2017) was an emeritus professor of landscape architecture who promoted the "environmental corridor" concept. He taught for more than 40 years at the University of Illinois (1953–1963) and the University of Wisconsin–Madison (1964–1994). Charles Little, author of Greenways for America, describes Lewis as the "...most inventive (and occasionally controversial) figure in regional landscape planning theory in the country".

== Early years ==
Lewis was born in Robinson, Illinois (20 miles from his hometown of Lawrenceville, Illinois), United States, on September 4, 1925. His father, Philip Howard Lewis Sr. (1890–1971), was an attorney who was a county judge and a state's attorney (1924–1930). His mother, Florence Sutfin Lewis (1900–1998), was a homemaker who worked at the First National Bank in Lawrenceville, Illinois. He had a younger sister, Gretchen.

== Education ==
Lewis graduated from Lawrenceville Township High School in 1943. He enlisted in the Army Air Force upon graduation and completed a six-month training program at Hondo Air Base in Hondo, Texas, where he received navigation training. He completed his service with the Army Air Force in 1946. He attended the University of Illinois Urbana-Champaign on the G.I. bill, receiving a bachelor's degree in landscape architecture in 1950. Influential figures during his undergraduate training included Stanley Hart White and Karl B. Lohmann. His education at the University of Illinois culminated in a trip to California to view contemporary landscape architecture projects with his favorite teacher, Hideo Sasaki. This trip included tours of gardens that had been designed by Thomas Dolliver Church and Garrett Eckbo. Following this trip, Lewis secured his first professional job as a landscape architect with the O. E. Goetz Nursery in Webster Groves, Missouri.

After working at the Goetz Nursery, he attended Harvard Graduate School of Design, (1950–1953), where he earned a master's degree in landscape architecture.

Lewis completed a summer internship with the National Park Service in 1952, where he learned about governmental agency interdisciplinary efforts to maintain the landscapes under their jurisdiction. His thesis focused on the Everglades Inventory and Development Study.

On June 13, 1953, Lewis married Elizabeth Alice Thompson, a botany student at Radcliffe College. They were married for 58 years until her death on February 1, 2012.

Lewis was awarded a Charles Eliot Traveling Fellowship in Landscape Architecture for his work on the Everglades. The fellowship allowed Lewis and his newlywed to travel to Europe for a year-long honeymoon and period of discovery. They viewed the landscapes of England, Scotland, Spain, Italy, Switzerland, Germany, Denmark, Sweden and Norway. These experiences sparked Lewis's interest in museums, communicating with the public, and the creation of spaces for buying local products.

== Planning and teaching career ==
After returning from Europe, Lewis worked for the University of Illinois Bureau of Community Planning from 1953 to 1963. He taught City Planning Research with visiting professor Patrick Horsbrugh in the spring of 1957. Horsbrugh and Lewis became lifelong friends and colleagues.

Lewis was the director of the Recreation and Open Space Study of Illinois from 1958 to 1961. Here he identified environmental corridors and landscape personalities that were used to guide planning efforts. He was recruited by Wisconsin Governor Gaylord Nelson to serve as the Director of the State of Wisconsin Recreation Resource, Research and Design, Department of Resource Development, where he served from 1963 to 1965. Environmental corridors were again identified in the Wisconsin State Recreation Plan to help guide planning decisions in the state.

Lewis became the founder and director of the Environmental Awareness Center, part of the School of Natural Resources and the College of Agriculture and Life Sciences. Lewis had joint appointments with the Department of Landscape Architecture, Department of Urban & Regional Planning, and the University of Wisconsin–Extension. Lewis also served as chair of the UW Landscape Architecture Department from 1964 to 1972 and taught undergraduate and graduate design courses. Shortly before his retirement in 1995 he served as the Jens Jensen Professor of Landscape Architecture.

Lewis was a visiting professor in the School of Design at Harvard University from 1976 to 1977.

Lewis contributed to the origins of geographic information systems technology with his application of maps using transparent overlays for environmental planning. The Environmental Systems Research Institute (Esri) presented Lewis with its Lifetime Achievement Award in 2000.

Lewis, along with Ian McHarg and Angus Hills, are credited with the development of the natural resource inventory approach and map overlays as a crucial part of the design process.

Lewis celebrated his retirement from the University of Wisconsin at a banquet on April 22, 1995.

=== Early studies at Illinois ===
- Embarrass/Ambraw River Valley Study (1958) - This study inventoried water, wetland, and steep topography resources, noting that these resource patterns could be used to guide regional planning and design.
- Wabash River Valley Study (1958) - Lewis employed an interdisciplinary planning team of graduate students from the University of Illinois, Purdue University, and Indiana University to take inventorying and design to a larger scale.
- Study of recreation and open space in Illinois, Department of City Planning and Landscape Architecture and the Bureau of Community Planning, University of Illinois (1961) - This study aimed at identifying environmental corridors and landscape personalities through the inventory and mapping of natural resources.

== Later life ==
After the death of his wife, Lewis lived at Middleton Glen in the new-urban planned community of Middleton Hills. This traditional neighborhood in the City of Middleton, Wisconsin was developed by his long-time friend Marshall Erdman. A street in Middleton Hills is named after Lewis. Lewis resided at Waunakee Manor, Waunakee, Wisconsin, before he died on July 2, 2017. On September 12, 2013, the Dane County, Wisconsin Board of Supervisors dedicated a Madison E-Way to Lewis, to be known as the Lewis Nine Springs E-Way. The title recognizes the work of Lewis and his wife, Elizabeth (Libby), who served for 26 years on the Dane County Parks Commission.

The Lewis family helped establish the Friends of Dane County Parks Endowment, managed by the Madison Community Foundation. The fund supports activities involving education, interpretation and volunteerism within parks and the promotion of the E-Way concept.

== Awards and recognition ==
- American Society of Landscape Architects, Honors & Awards. American Society of Landscape Architects Medal, 1987
- Wisconsin Idea Award, Center for Resource Policy Studies, University of Wisconsin - Madison, (1993).
- Distinguished Service Award, Capital Community Citizens, 1997
- Esri Lifetime Achievement Award, 2000, presented by Jack Dangermond
- Conservation/Environment Award, Kiwanis Club of Downtown, Madison, Wisconsin, 2001
- Bolz Lifetime Stewardship Award, Natural Heritage Land Trust, 2004
- Ten of the Best Award, 1000 Friends of Wisconsin, 2006
- First recipient of the Wisconsin Department of Natural Resources/SEWRPC Environmental Corridor Ovation Award 2007
- Lifetime Achievement Award, ASLA Wisconsin Chapter, 2009
- Inaugural Bringing Bioneers to Wisconsin Award, Sustain Dane & the BioPharmaceutical Technology Center Institute, 2009
- Lifetime Achievement Award, Keeping Greater Milwaukee Beautiful, 2013
- Excellence in Teaching Fellowship, Council of Educators in Landscape Architecture, 2014
