= Chase Fine Arts Center =

Arts complex at Utah State University, US

Coordinates: 41°44′34″N 111°48′19″W

- Interactive map of Chase Fine Arts Center
- Location: 4030 Old Main Hill; Logan, Utah; United States
- Owner: Utah State University
- Type: Fine Arts Center

Construction
- Opened: 1967

Website
- Venue website

The Daryl Chase Fine Arts Center is a multi-venue visual and performing arts complex on the campus of Utah State University. It is named for Daryl Chase, the tenth president of USU, who served from 1954 to 1968.

It houses performance venues such as the Newel & Jean Daines Concert Hall, the Morgan Theatre, the Tippetts Balcony, the Black Box Studio Theatre, and the Tippetts Exhibit Hall. It also serves as the home of the Departments of Art, Music, Theatre, and Landscape Architecture and Environmental Planning at USU, and contains numerous practice rooms, lecture halls, and offices.

Along with the Manon Caine Russell Kathryn Caine Wanlass Performance Hall, the Nora Eccles Harrison Museum of Art, and the Caine Lyric Theatre, the Chase Fine Arts Center anchors the Fine Arts Complex at USU.

== Performance venues ==
=== Newel & Jean Daines Concert Hall ===
The 1,743 seat Newel & Jean Daines Concert Hall is the anchor and largest venue of the Chase Fine Arts Center, serving primarily as a performance space for orchestras, large bands, and choirs. As it is the largest auditorium on the campus of Utah State University, as well as the entire Cache Valley, it serves national and international touring music, dance, and theater productions in addition to community events and university tenants such as Craig Jessop's American Festival Chorus. The Newel & Jean Daines opened with the Chase Fine Arts Center in 1967. The concert hall also houses the largest pipe organ in Logan, built in 1973 by the Holtkamp organ company of Cleveland, Ohio. The instrument comprises 43 stops, 56 ranks and 3,027 individual pipes. It is installed on the west wall of the concert hall in Holtkamp's signature functional, modern design aesthetic.

=== Other performance venues ===
The 670-seat Morgan Theatre is a thrust theatre, and is home to smaller, more intimate theatrical productions, including the majority of productions put on by the Theatre Department at USU.

The Chase Fine Arts Center also houses a smaller venue called the Tippets Balcony, a 150-seat glass-enclosed recital space, and a Black Box Studio Theatre, which can seat up to 90 for extremely intimate productions.

== Visual art museums and galleries ==
=== Other visual arts spaces ===
The Chase Fine Arts Center houses the Tippets Exhibit Hall, which is adjacent to the Tippets Balcony. The Exhibit Hall is a 4,500 sq ft (420 m^{2}). gallery which often displays work done by USU students and faculty.

== Educational amenities ==
In addition to the exhibition and performance space, the Chase Fine Arts Center contains numerous amenities for student use, including 15,000 square feet (1,400 m^{2}) of ceramics space. Ceramics students utilize seven kilns of various shapes and sizes, as well as individual studio spaces and studio equipment for students. Graphic design students and others interested in multimedia have use of the Fine Arts-Visual computer lab with design and video editing software and equipment. Photography labs and individual music practice rooms may also be rented out by students.
