= Mildred Towne Powell =

American politician (1886–1977)

Mildred T. Powell
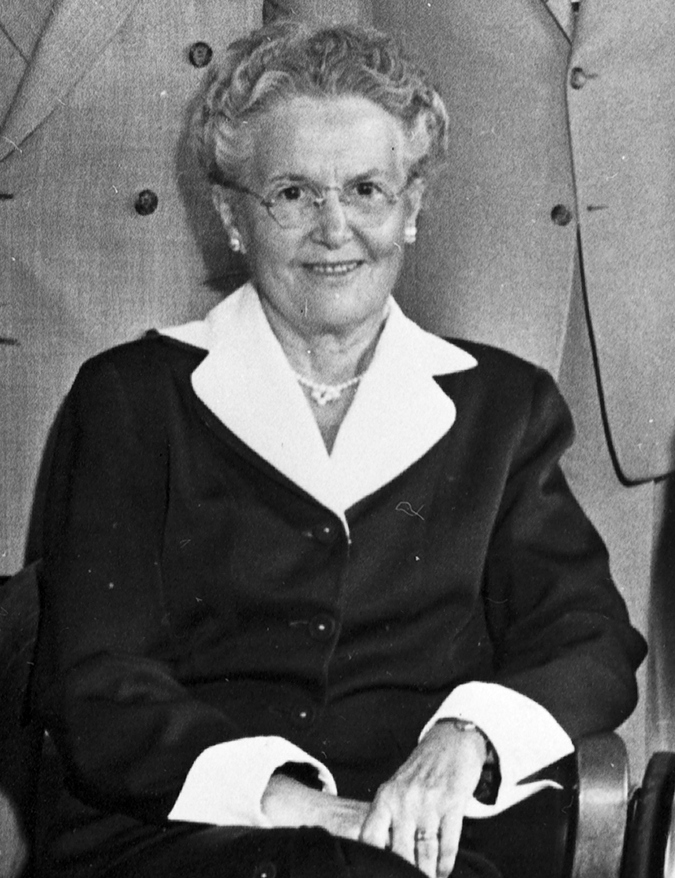

Member of the Seattle City Council
- In office 1935 – May 10, 1955

President of the Seattle City Council
- In office 1940–1941

Personal details
- Born: February 9, 1886; New London, Connecticut, U.S.
- Died: June 16, 1977 (aged 91); Seattle, Washington
- Spouse: Francis Foster Powell
- Education: Smith College (BA)

Mildred Towne Powell (February 9, 1886 – June 16, 1977) was an American politician who served on the Seattle city council from 1935 until her resignation in 1955. She was an active member of the Moral Re-Armament movement until her death in 1977.

== Biography ==
Powell was born on February 9, 1886, in New London, Connecticut. She attended Smith College where she earned her bachelor's degree in 1908, and became a teacher. In 1910, she married her husband, Francis Foster Powell, moved to Montana, and resettled again in 1923 to Seattle.

She was actively involved in the local community, becoming president of the Seattle Parent Teacher Association.

== Seattle city council ==
After her husband died in 1934, she was encouraged by city leaders, including Bertha Knight Landes, to run for Seattle City Council. She said, "The idea (of running for the City Council in a city whose politics was dominated by men) sounded preposterous, but, as I say, I had to do something. Powell was elected to city council on March 12, 1935, in a top-three general election, coming in third behind Frederick Hamley and Arthur B. Langlie. She ran as Mrs. F. F. Powell in honor of her husband, and was referred that way throughout her first term.

Powell served for 20 years, winning reelection six times, and was council president from 1940 to 1941. In 1950, Powell unsuccessfully ran for Congress in Washington's 1st congressional district.

Powell was an active member of the Moral Re-Armament (MRA) movement, an organization that supported world peace and unity and strongly opposed Communism, throughout her political career. She described the MRA movement as aiming to "restore God to leadership as the directing force in the lives of men and of nations."

Powell was invited to join a peacemaking journey to 28 countries in Asia and the Middle East sponsored by the group Moral Re-Armament. She resigned on May 10, 1955, and Myrtle Edwards was appointed to fill the seat, which Powell supported. She continued to speak and advocate for MRA until she died in 1977.

== Personal life ==
Powell was active in many civic and religious organizations, including as vice president of the Seattle Council of Churches and on the boards of directors of Goodwill Industries and Camp Fire Girls. She died on June 16, 1977 and was survived by three sons.
