= Adjacent, Against, Upon =

1976 sculpture by Michael Heizer in Seattle, Washington, U.S.

- Artist: Michael Heizer
- Location: Seattle, Washington, U.S.
- 47°37′10″N 122°21′42″W

Adjacent, Against, Upon is a 1976 sculpture by Michael Heizer, installed in Seattle's Myrtle Edwards Park, in the U.S. state of Washington. The work was the first commissioned by the Seattle Arts Commission. It has been described as "exquisite" and "iconic". The piece is made up of three enormous natural granite slabs resting on or near three concrete plinths.

== See also ==
- 1976 in art
