= Cherie Kluesing =

American landscape architect, designer, and educator

- Died: 1989
- Education: University of Illinois
- Occupation: landscape architect

Cherie Kluesing was an American landscape architect, designer, and educator. She received a Boston Society of Landscape Architects award in 1988 for her restoration plan for Frederick Law Olmsted's Buttonwood Park in New Bedford, Massachusetts. She wrote extensively on land art and landscape architecture, and was known for her advocacy for integrating art works and landscape.

== Early life ==
Born in Peoria, Illinois, Kluesing lived in various locations in the Midwest during her formative years. Her parents, Byron and Ginger, had two other later offspring, John and Nancy. The near Kluesing family was composed of siblings John, Alvin, Peter, Olga and Herman. Byron, Cherie's father, was a child of John's first wife along with Alvin and Millie. Cherie often mentioned the childhood influences of her great-uncle Herman Kluesing, great-aunt Olga Ryan and aunt Marylin Duke (daughter of Peter). Herman, an interior designer, created a sketch of World War I that is reputedly part of the Louvre's collection. Childless, Herman spent time with Marylin Duke, as well as John's other stepchildren Connie Springborn and Lucy Ihrcke. Olga was a milliner and Marylin Duke was a costume designer. Connie Springborn worked briefly for Marylin Duke who influenced her to attend art school at McMurry College. She later completed her studies at the Museum School at Boston's Museum of Fine Arts. Cherie and her aunt Connie met later (c1983) and formed a familial and artistic bond.

== Education ==
Kluesing received her Bachelor of Fine Arts from the Bradley University in 1969 under the tutelage of Nita Sunderland and others. She continued her studies at Temple University, Tyler School of Art. With the Creative and Performing Arts fellowship, she received her Masters of Landscape Architecture degree from University of Illinois in 1978 along with the Outstanding Graduate Student Award from the American Society of Landscape Architects. Her thesis focused on Allerton Park in Monticello, IL, a 1,517 acre former estate that is now a National Historic Place. Her thesis dealt with issues of art in the landscape and historic preservation, two topics that became central to her practice in later life.

== Teaching ==
Chair Robert Riley and Natalie Alpert recognized the promise Kluesing offered and brought her on as part of the faculty upon her graduation. Kluesing began teaching as an assistant professor at the Department of Landscape Architecture at the University of Illinois (1978 to 1982) where she served as Chair of the Lorado Taft Lecture Committee from 1981 to 1982 and received the Outstanding Educator Award from the Council of Educators in Landscape Architecture (CELA) in 1981. She moved on the Harvard Graduate School of Design (GSD) an assistant professor from 1982 - 1985 where she taught with Laurie Olin, Peter Walker, Carl Steinitz and Michael Van Valkenburgh.

== Professional work ==
Kluesing was exposed to landscape architecture while working for Barton-Ashman Associates in Evanston, IL from 1973 to 1975 where she contributed primarily as a graphic designer on urban redevelopment planning projects prior to attending the University of Illinois. Kluesing began professional practice with Walker Design Group in Urbana, Illinois in 1979. She became a partner with Walker-Kluesing Design Group as the office moved from Belmont, MA to Boston, MA in 1985. The work focused on a mix of institutional, commercial, corporate and public work, with the latter focusing primarily on large historic parks.

== Honors and awards ==
Individual Project Fellowship, National Endowment for the Arts, Design Arts Program Grant, 'New Landscapes: Observing the National Collection', 1984 - 1985

Research Grant, Harvard University Graduate School of Design, 'Observing the National Landscape: 25 Years of Art on the American Landscape', 1983

Merit Award, American Society of Landscape Architects, "Reclamation Works: An Aesthetic Approach to Land Reclamation", 1981

Outstanding Educator Award, Council of Educators in Landscape Architecture, 1981

Entering Professional Designer Fellowship, National Endowment for the Arts, Design Arts Program, 1980 -1981

== Honors and awards with Walker-Kluesing Design Group ==
Merit Award, Boston Society of Landscape Architects, Visitor Center Park, Lawrence Heritage State Park, 1994

Merit Award, American Society of Landscape Architects, Boston Common Management Plan, 1992

Merit Award, Boston Society of Landscape Architects, Larz Anderson Park, Brookline, 1992

Merit Award, Boston Society of Landscape Architects, The Children's Hospital Gateway Park and Winter Garden, Boston MA 1990

Merit Award, Boston Society of Landscape Architects, Buttonwood Park Master Plan, New Bedford MA, 1988

Merit Award, Boston Society of Landscape Architects, Viewing Courtyard, Boston MA, 1988

== Publications ==
- "Site Artists: The Role of Outsiders in Landscape Design" Landscape Architecture, Volume 78, No. 3, pp 120, 104, 106, April/May 1988
- "Art: Creative Experiments in Re-Use of Mined Land", Rock Products Magazine, June 1987
- "New Realities: The Artist in the Landscape", Radcliffe Quarterly, March, 1987.
- "Site-Specific Art: Landscape as Medium", Art New England, May 1986.

== The Cherie Kluesing Fellowship ==
The Cherie Kluesing Fellowship is a full tuition fellowship that is awarded to an entering graduate student in the Landscape Architecture (at the University of Illinois) who shows the best promise for integrating art and design.
