= University of Illinois Department of Landscape Architecture =

Academic unit at the University of Illinois at Urbana-Champaign

The University of Illinois at Urbana–Champaign was among the first institutions in the nation to offer an educational program in landscape architecture, with a degree program in place by 1907. It is the only accredited program in the state of Illinois to offer all three landscape degree options, BLA, MLA and Ph.D.

Today, the department sponsors one of the leading graduate-level academic and research programs in the country. The department was particularly influential in the modernization of landscape pedagogy through the teaching of Stanley Hart White, impacting the work of Peter Walker, Hideo Sasaki, Richard Haag, Charles Harris, Philip H. Lewis Jr. and others.
