= Stanley White (cricketer) =

South African cricketer (1910–1981)

Personal information
- Born: 12 March 1910; Grahamstown, South Africa
- Died: 9 December 1981 (aged 71); Knysna, South Africa
- Source: Cricinfo, 12 December 2020

Stanley White (12 March 1910 – 9 December 1981) was a South African cricketer. He played in 36 first-class matches from 1928/29 to 1939/40.
