= Performance Hall (Utah State University) =

Coordinates: 41°44′36″N 111°48′24″W

Manon Caine Russell Kathryn Caine Wanlass Performance Hall
- Performance Hall
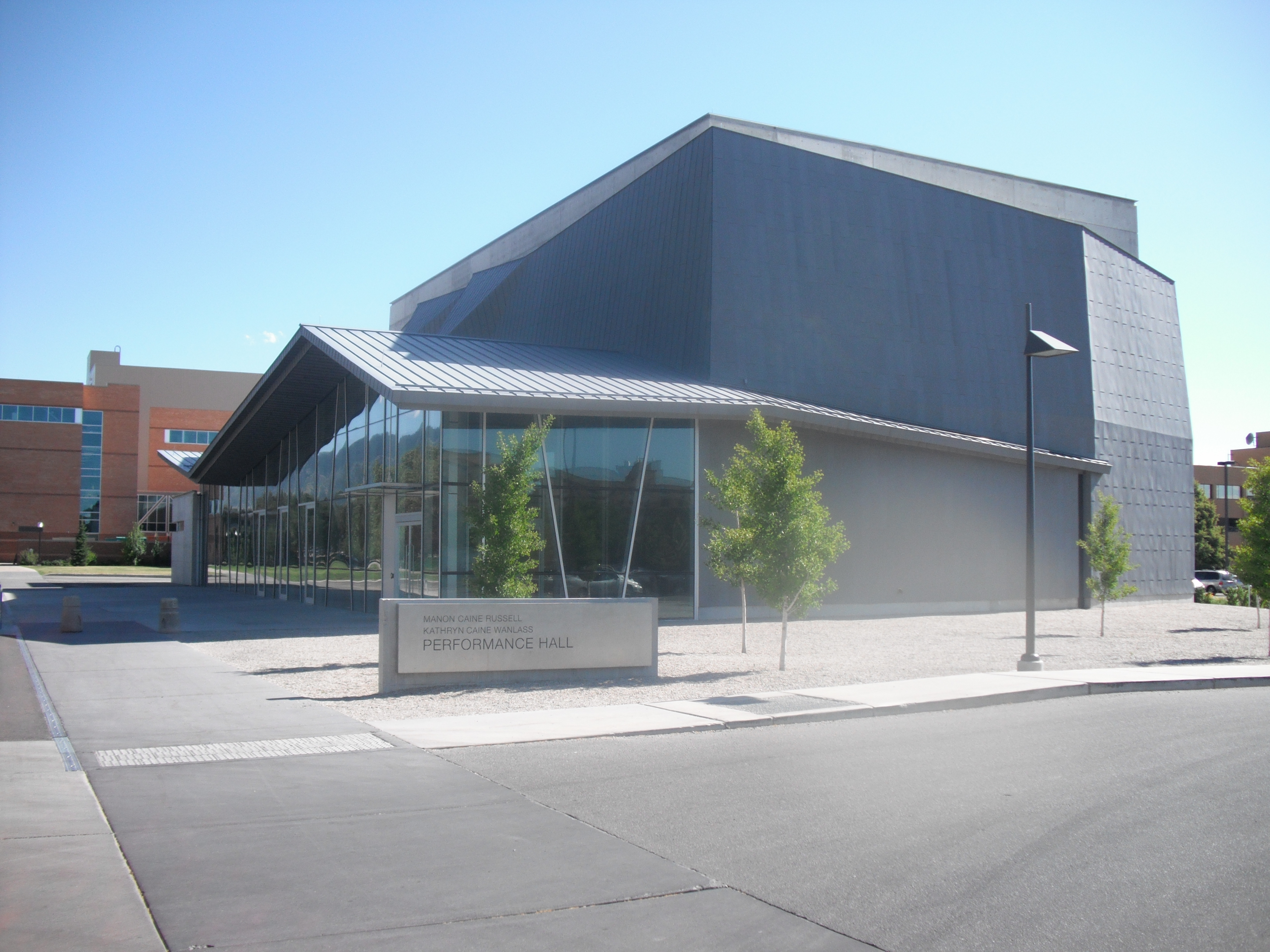
- Interactive map of Manon Caine Russell Kathryn Caine Wanlass Performance Hall
- Location: 4030 Old Main Hill; Logan, Utah; United States
- Owner: Utah State University
- Capacity: 421
- Type: Concert hall

Construction
- Opened: 2006
- Cost: $12 million

The Manon Caine Russell Kathryn Caine Wanlass Performance Hall is a modern recital hall on the campus of Utah State University.

The Performance Hall, by which name it is usually known, was a gift to USU from two alumni sisters in 2006. Since its opening, the Performance Hall has become widely known in the region for its architecture and acoustics. The building itself was designed by Boston firm Sasaki Associates with acoustics overseen by Artec Consultants. The building is said to have some of the best acoustics in the western United States. Great lengths were taken in construction to ensure sound quality, such as the suspension of all mechanical systems on pads or springs "to avoid the slightest vibration or extraneous sound." The building has won numerous regional awards for its design, including from the Utah Chapter of the American Institute of Architects, and Best Architecture Project and Best Mechanical/Electrical Project from Intermountain Contractor.

The Performance Hall is used principally for student recitals from the Caine College of the Arts at USU. It also houses the Fry Street Quartet, USU's string-quartet-in-residence, as well as a limited number of smaller touring productions. Together with the Chase Fine Arts Center next door, it constitutes a significant portion of the Fine Arts Complex on the Logan campus of Utah State University.
