= Myrtle Edwards (politician) =

American politician

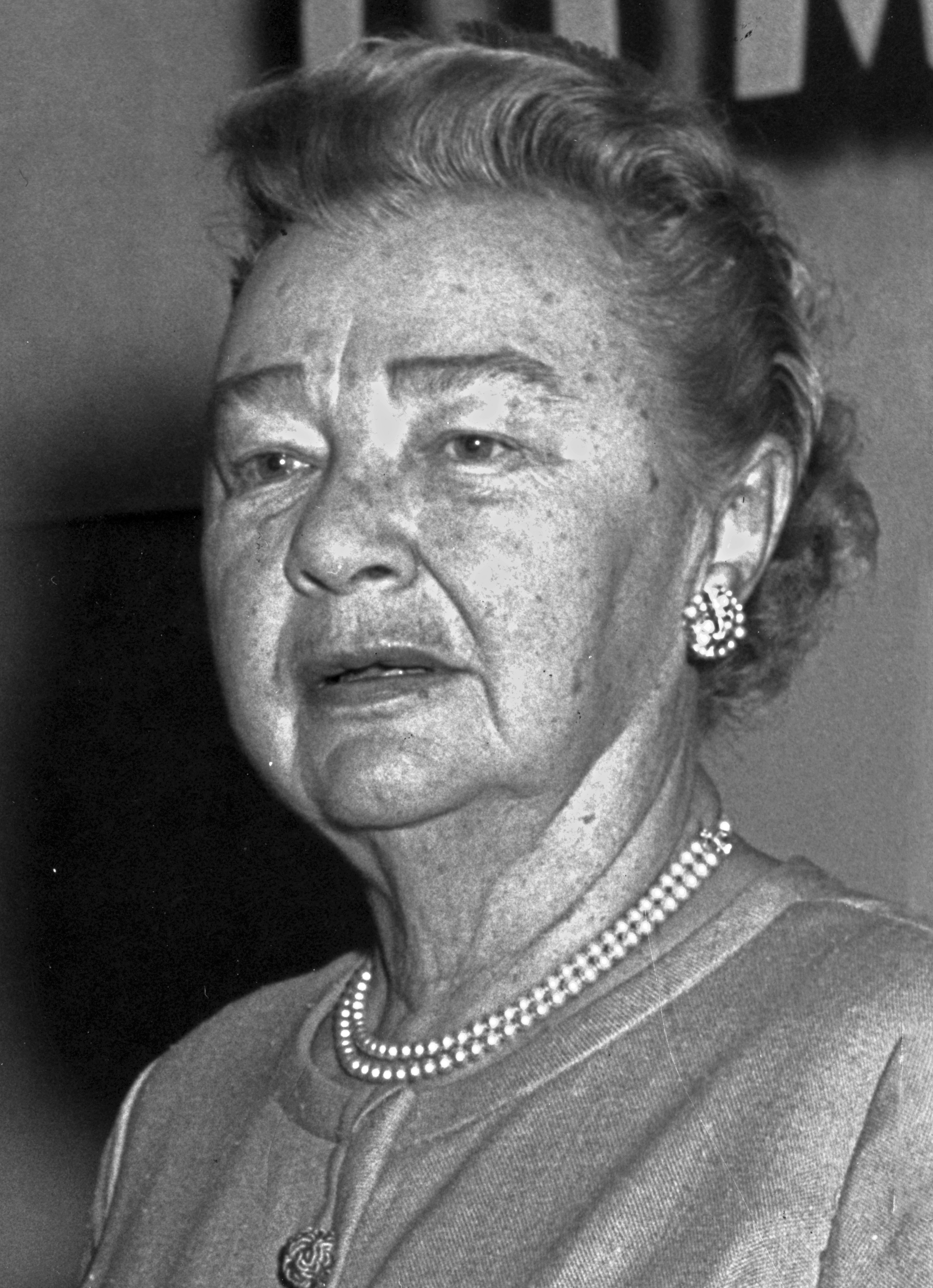

President of the Seattle City Council
- In office May 25, 1964 – August 18, 1969

Personal details
- Born: 1894
- Died: August 18, 1969 (aged 74–75) near Kellogg, Idaho
- Education: University of Illinois Chicago, University of Washington

Myrtle Edwards (1894 – August 18, 1969) was an American politician and civil activist from Seattle, Washington. She served as a member of the Seattle City Council from 1955 to 1969, becoming Council President in 1969.

== Education and career ==
Edwards graduated with a bachelor's degree from the University of Illinois Chicago where she became a voice teacher at the American Conservatory of Music. After moving to Seattle during World War II with her husband Harlan H. Edwards and her two children, she graduated from the University of Washington with a bachelor's degree in political science and public administration. Edwards was active in several local political organizations, serving as president of the Seattle and Washington chapters of the League of Women Voters and promoting expansions of the park system with Seattle Beautiful, Inc.

She was appointed to Seattle City Council on May 25, 1955, replacing Mildred Towne Powell as the sole woman on the council. Edwards had previously served on the city's planning commission. She was elected outright to Powell's seat the following year. In the 1964 election, she received the most votes of any council candidate. Edwards was named the Council President on March 31, 1969, replacing mayor-elect Floyd C. Miller. At the time, she had planned to retire from public life at the end of her term.

== Death and legacy ==
Edwards died on August 18, 1969, from injuries sustained in a car crash on Interstate 90 near Kellogg, Idaho. Businessman Ray Eckman was appointed to fill her council seat until the next election. The city planned to name a new park on the north side of Lake Union in honor of Edwards, but objections from her family led to it being named Gas Works Park instead. A park on Elliott Bay was named Myrtle Edwards Park in 1976.
