= Myrtle Edwards Park =

Public park in Seattle, Washington, United States

- A great blue heron fishing along the shore in Myrtle Edwards Park
- Interactive map of Myrtle Edwards Park
- Type: Urban Park
- Location: Seattle, Washington
- Coordinates: 47°37′09″N 122°21′41″W
- Area: 4.8 acres (1.9 ha)
- Operator: Seattle Parks and Recreation

Myrtle Edwards Park in Seattle, Washington is a 4.8-acre (1.9 ha) public park along the Elliott Bay waterfront north of Belltown, Seattle, in the state of Washington, United States. It features a 1.25-mile (2.01 km) long bicycle and walking path and is a good place to see eagles, gulls, and crows.

The park was originally named Elliott Bay Park but was renamed after the late Seattle city councilwoman Myrtle Edwards in 1976 after her family withdrew her name from what is now Gas Works Park because of the design emphasis on the gasification plant. Now, Myrtle Edwards Park celebrates a different kind of plant — the hemp plant — by hosting the annual Seattle Hempfest. From 1964 until 2008 the park was the site of the annual Fourth of Jul-Ivar's celebration — one of Seattle's large Fourth of July fireworks shows.

The Olympic Sculpture Park, part of Seattle Art Museum, opened on the southern end in 2007. At the northern end is Centennial Park operated by the Port of Seattle, which was also known as Elliott Bay Park until 2011. Near the park's northern end is the sculpture Adjacent, Against, Upon (1976) by Michael Heizer. The Myrtle Edwards and Centennial parks are sometimes described as a single park.

The BNSF Railroad tracks and a fence run along the long, narrow park's eastern side. Beyond the tracks is a major roadway, Elliott Avenue West. These obstacles make it difficult to enter the park except at the northern and southern ends. A pedestrian/bicycle overpass at West Thomas Street (47.6202°N 122.3620°W), approximately 1/2 mi (0.80 km) from the park's southern end, was constructed in 2012 to address these concerns.

Myrtle Edwards Park and Centennial Park underwent a major renovation from March 2025 to June 2026 to replace the existing infrastructure, which had been built on fill from the construction of Interstate 5. The $56 million project was entirely funded through private donations from Melinda French Gates, MacKenzie Scott, and other contributors.
