= Hideo Sasaki =

American landscape architect (1919–2000)

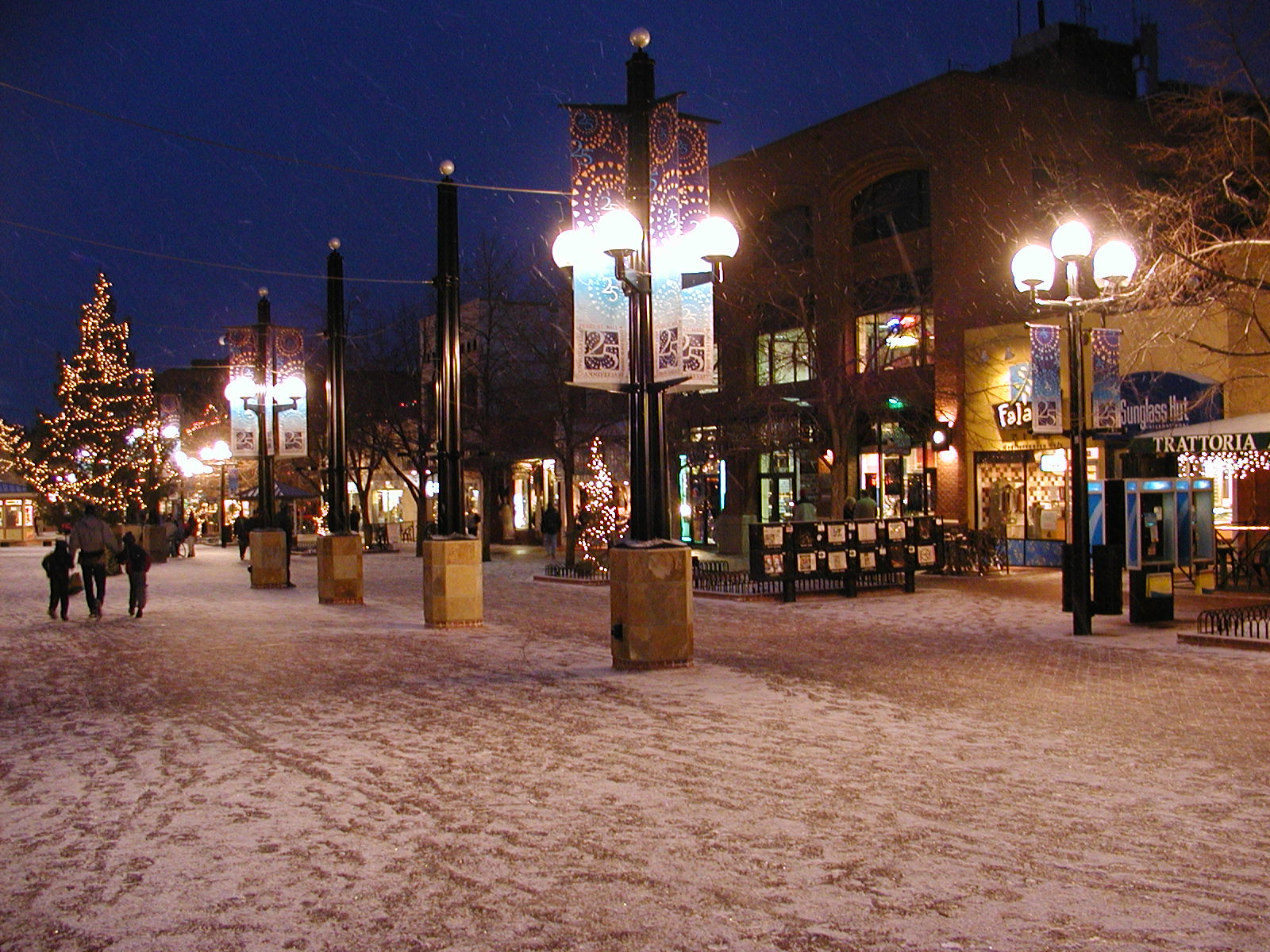
Pearl Street Mall, Boulder, Colorado

Hideo Sasaki (Japanese: 佐々木 秀夫, 25 November 1919 – 30 August 2000) was an American landscape architect.

== Biography ==
Hideo Sasaki was born in Reedley, California, on 25 November 1919. He grew up working on his family's California truck farm, and harvesting crops on Arizona farms. He began his college studies at the University of California, Berkeley during the time of World War II. Owing to his Japanese descent, he was forced into the Poston War Relocation Center in Arizona after the signing of Executive Order 9066. He was able to leave the camp upon volunteering to work as a farm hand in Sterling, Colorado.

Soon after the war, he moved to Denver, Colorado where he met his wife, Kisa, a graduate of the University of Colorado Boulder. Sasaki then moved to the University of Illinois Department of Landscape Architecture where he received Bachelor of Fine Arts and Landscape Architecture in 1946. During his time at the University of Illinois at Urbana-Champaign, Sasaki worked with Charles Harris.

In 1948 he graduated with a Master of Landscape Architecture from Harvard Graduate School of Design. After graduation he returned to Illinois where he instructed for two years. For the next eighteen years (1953-1970) he became a professor and the chairman of the department of Landscape Architecture of the Harvard Graduate School of Design. In 1953, he founded Sasaki Associates, incorporated in nearby Watertown, Massachusetts, where he was the president and chairman until 1980. He led the company's architects and planners in developing many noted commercial areas and corporate parks. In 1956 he worked on the design of the Havana Plan Piloto with Mario Romañach and the Catalan architect Josep Lluís Sert. Fellow landscape architect Peter Walker would join Sasaki Associates and become a partner in 1957; in the following decade, the firm would expand significantly, from six landscape architects to over 200 in various disciplines.

During his later years he lived with his family (wife and two daughters, Rin and Ann) in Lafayette, California. He died on 30 August 2000 in a hospital in Walnut Creek, California.

== Architectural experience ==
Hideo Sasaki had partnered with Peter Walker to create Sasaki Walker and Associates. After creating the firm, Sasaki was able to expand his company into having offices in San Francisco, Nashville, Baltimore, Denver, and Washington, D.C. in the United States, as well as Canada. The firm's work includes Golden Gateway Center, San Francisco (1959–1960—with Skidmore, Owings, & Merrill); Foothill College, Los Altos, California (1960–1962); Weyerhaeuser Headquarters, Tacoma, Washington (1963–1972); the roof-gardens, etc., Bona-ventura Hotel, Montréal, Quebec (1964–1968—designed by Masao Kinoshita); Greenacre Park, New York City (1970–1972); Constitution Plaza, Hartford, Connecticut (1969–1973); and the John Deere & Co. headquarters, Moline, Illinois (1957–1963—with buildings by Saarinen).

The Cultural Landscape Foundation described the firm as, "The firm evolved through various configurations, but consistent was Sasaki's conviction in the notion of oasis and that landscapes can restore the human spirit." He is credited with introducing the modernist design principles of minimalism and abstraction to landscape architecture. He was instrumental in developing the “Sasaki Style” which emphasized the integration of natural and man-made elements, the use of simple materials, and the integration of landscape, architecture, and urbanism. He was the first landscape architect to receive the American Society of Landscape Architects' Medal of Excellence, in 1972. Some of Sasaki's most notable works include the Benjamin Franklin Parkway in Philadelphia, the San Francisco State College campus, the First National Bank Plaza in Minneapolis, and the National Mall in Washington, DC.

== Major projects ==
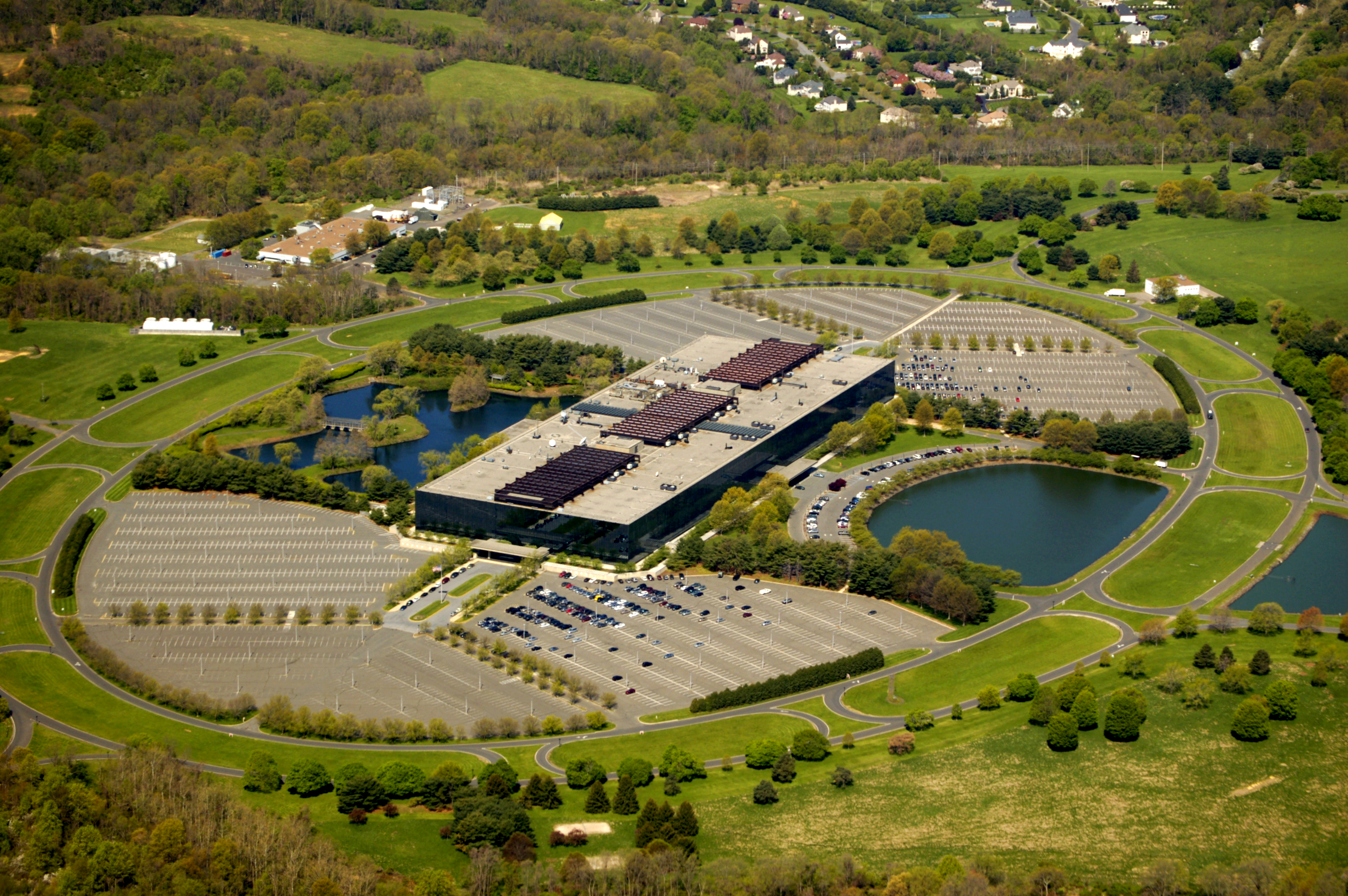
Aerial view of Bell Labs Holmdel Complex, Holmdel Township, New Jersey, completed in 1962

Sasaki's firm operated under his own name, as Sasaki Associates, as Sasaki, Walker & Associates (with landscape architect Peter Walker), as Sasaki, Strong & Associates in Toronto (with landscape architect Richard Strong) and as Sasaki, Dawson, DeMay Associates, Inc..

- Foothill College, Los Altos Hills, California, 1957
- master plan for Goucher College, Towson, Maryland, 1957
- Washington Square Village, Greenwich Village, New York City, 1958
- master plan for Sea Pines Resort, Hilton Head, South Carolina, circa 1961
- Bell Labs Holmdel Complex, Holmdel Township, New Jersey, 1962
- consultant for York University, Toronto, 1962
- master plan for University of Massachusetts Amherst, Amherst, Massachusetts, 1962
- John Deere World Headquarters, Moline, Illinois, 1964
- One Maritime Plaza, San Francisco, California, 1964
- master plan for the Loomis Chaffee School, Windsor, Connecticut, 1967
- One Shell Plaza, Houston, Texas, 1971
- urban design for Pearl Street Mall, Boulder, Colorado, 1977
- Forrestal Village, Princeton, New Jersey, 1986
- Waterfront Park, Charleston, South Carolina, 1990
- Euro Disneyland in Paris, France, 1992
- master plan for The Arboretum at Penn State, State College, Pennsylvania, 1999
- Performance Hall, Utah State University, Logan, Utah, 2006
- master plan for the Puerto Rico Convention Center District, 2006
- redesign and reconstruction of the Ithaca Commons, 2015

== Awards and achievements ==
- In 1961 President John F. Kennedy appointed Sasaki to the U.S. Commission of Fine Arts. He held this position until 1971, being re-appointed by President Lyndon B. Johnson in 1965.
- In 1971 he received the American Society of Landscape Architects Medal, the first person to do so.
- In 1973 he received the Allied Professions Medal from the American Institute of Architects.
- Sasaki was member of University of Colorado Boulder's four-member design review board for 33 years.
- He was chairman of the department of landscape architecture at the Harvard Graduate School of Design (1950-1968).
- He founded Sasaki Associates Inc. and was chairman and president of the board (1953-1980).
- He was a Juror for the Vietnam Veterans Memorial Competition in 1981, the Astronaut Memorial Competition in 1988 and the Peace Garden Competition in 1989.
- Sasaki was awarded the Centennial Medal for his impact on landscape architecture at the Harvard Design School, at a 1999 symposium on his work.
- In 1984 Sasaki was awarded an honorary doctorate from the University of Colorado Boulder.
