= Richard Haag =

American landscape architect

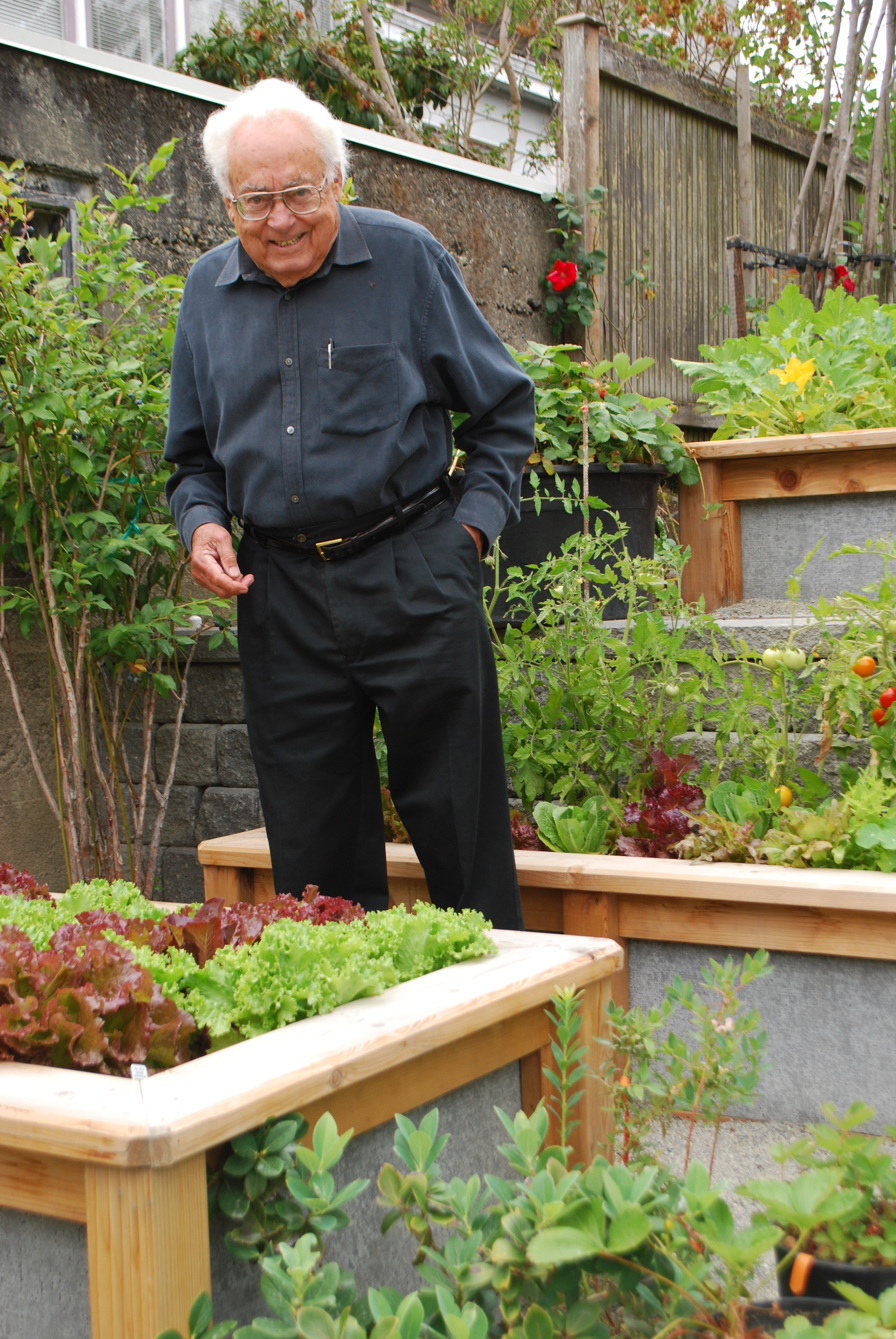
Richard Haag standing in a garden (details unknown)

Richard Haag (October 23, 1923 – May 9, 2018) was an American landscape architect who was known for his role in Gas Works Park in Seattle, Washington and on the Bloedel Reserve on Bainbridge Island. Richard Haag's modernist and minimalist ideals also set the tone for Northwestern landscape design.

== Early life and career ==
Richard Haag was born and raised in Louisville, Kentucky. He attended the University of Illinois, the University of California and received his bachelor's degree in Landscape Architecture (B.L.A.) from the University of California, Berkeley, and his master's degree in Landscape Architecture (M.L.A.) from the Harvard Graduate School of Design.

In 1958, Richard Haag joined the University of Washington faculty in Seattle, Washington and founded its Landscape Architecture Program.

While at the university, he was also the lead designer at Richard Haag Associates which he founded in 1968, before closing on June 30, 2016. Through his position at Richard Haag Associates, he worked on over 500 designing and planning projects. He died in May 2018 at the age of 94.

== Notable designs ==
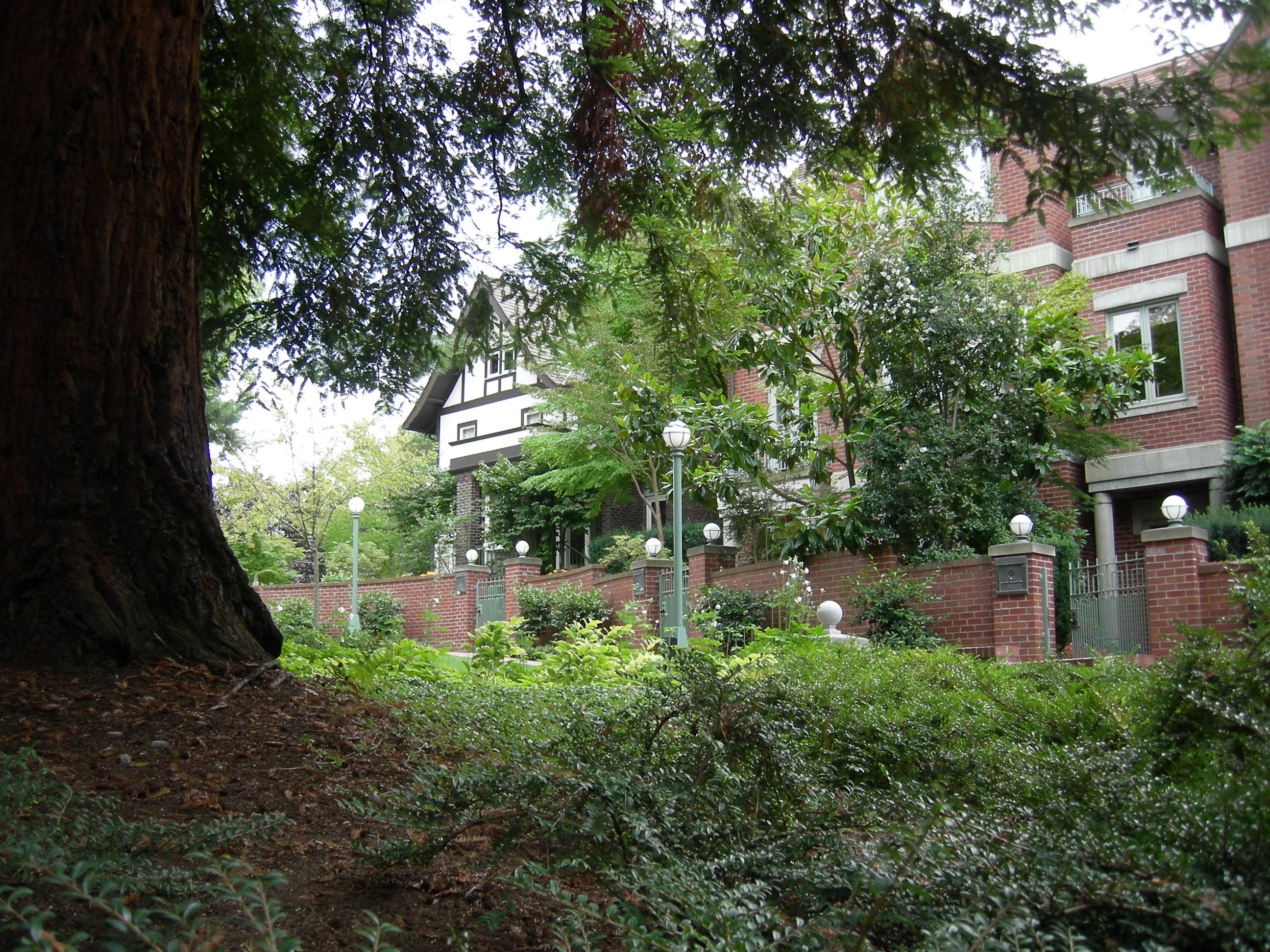
Landscaping at Merrill Court

- Gas Works Park - Seattle
- "Sequence of Gardens" at Bloedel Reserve - Bainbridge Island, Washington
- Battelle Research Center - Seattle
- Victor Steinbrueck Park - Seattle
- Jordan Park - Everett, Washington
- North Waterfront Park - Berkeley, California
- U.S. Courthouse Plaza - Spokane, Washington
- Washington Pass Overlook & Visiting Center - Winthrop, Washington
- Merrill Court Townhomes - Harvard-Belmont Historic District, Seattle
- Okanogan–Wenatchee National Forest - Winthrop, Washington
- Gilman Village - Issaquah, Washington

== Gas Works Park ==
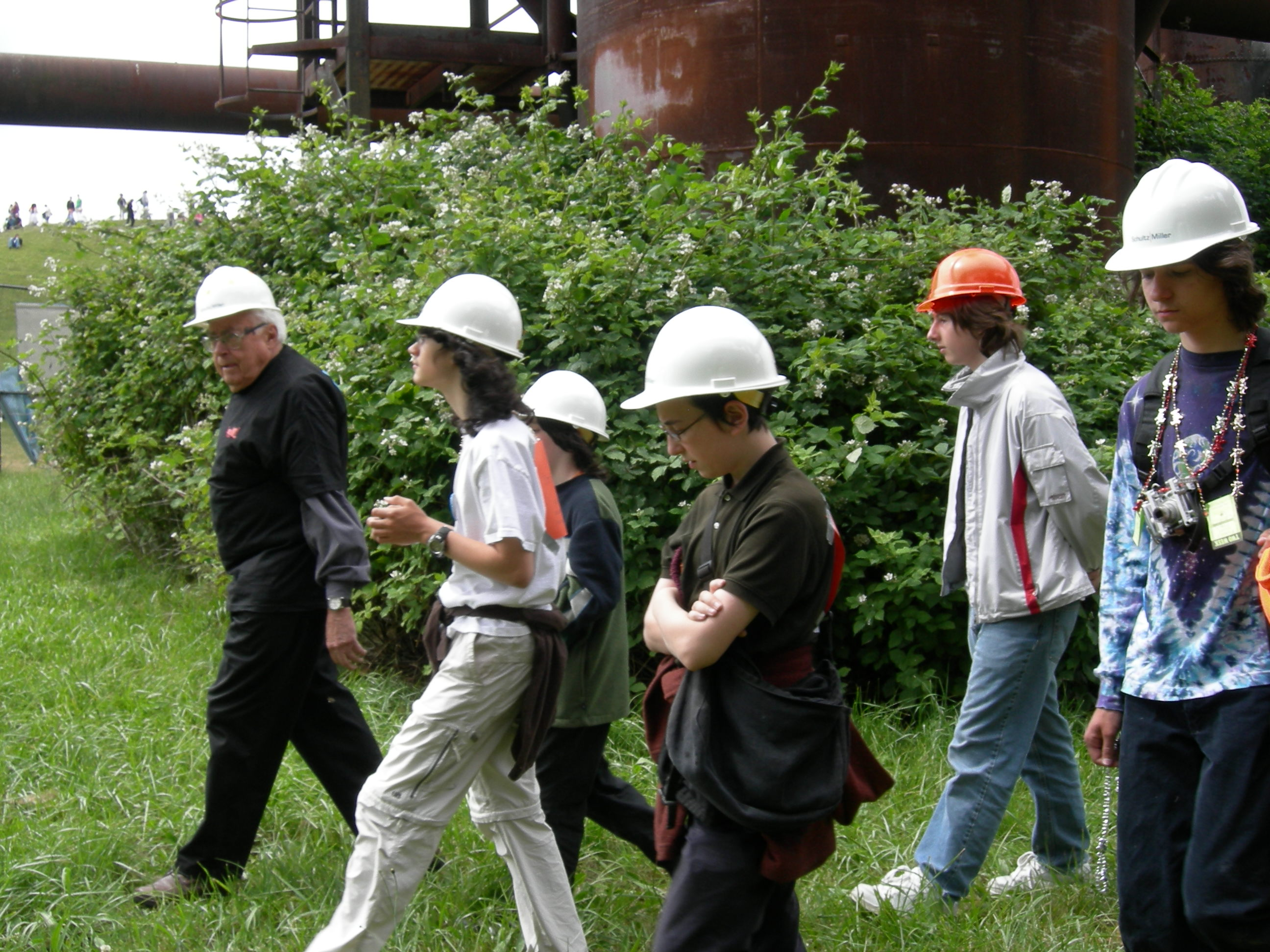
Haag leading a tour of the "forbidden zone" of Gas Works Park, 2007.

In 1906, on a peninsula on the northern shore of Lake Union, the Seattle Gas Company constructed a coal gas plant. By 1956, this plant was shut down and left behind old refinery towers. Upon the City of Seattle's purchase of the land in 1970, Haag was the lone person who was asked to develop a park design for the site. While most planners had expected the demolition of the refinery towers, Haag decided to keep them. However, he did not incorporate them into the design for historic purposes, but rather to visually enhance the design of the park.

While convincing city government to accept this radical plan was challenging, Haag's development of a design which integrated bioremediation methods in order to detoxify the soil without transporting and replacing it amplified the issue. Haag and his colleagues suggested using oil-degrading enzymes and organic material to stimulate growth of microorganisms and breakdown toxic materials that were still present in the soil left behind by the ancient industrial processes of the plant.

Before Richard Haag was asked to develop this design, he submitted the site as a design problem to a national undergraduate design competition. All 130 designs submitted removed any indication that a gas plant ever existed in that site. Through this, Haag took the environmentalist ideal to another level and acknowledged the potential aesthetics of industrial structures without causing harm to the environment. His design for Gas Works Park brought Haag his first American Society of Landscape Architects (ASLA) President's Award for Design Excellence.

== Bloedel Reserve ==
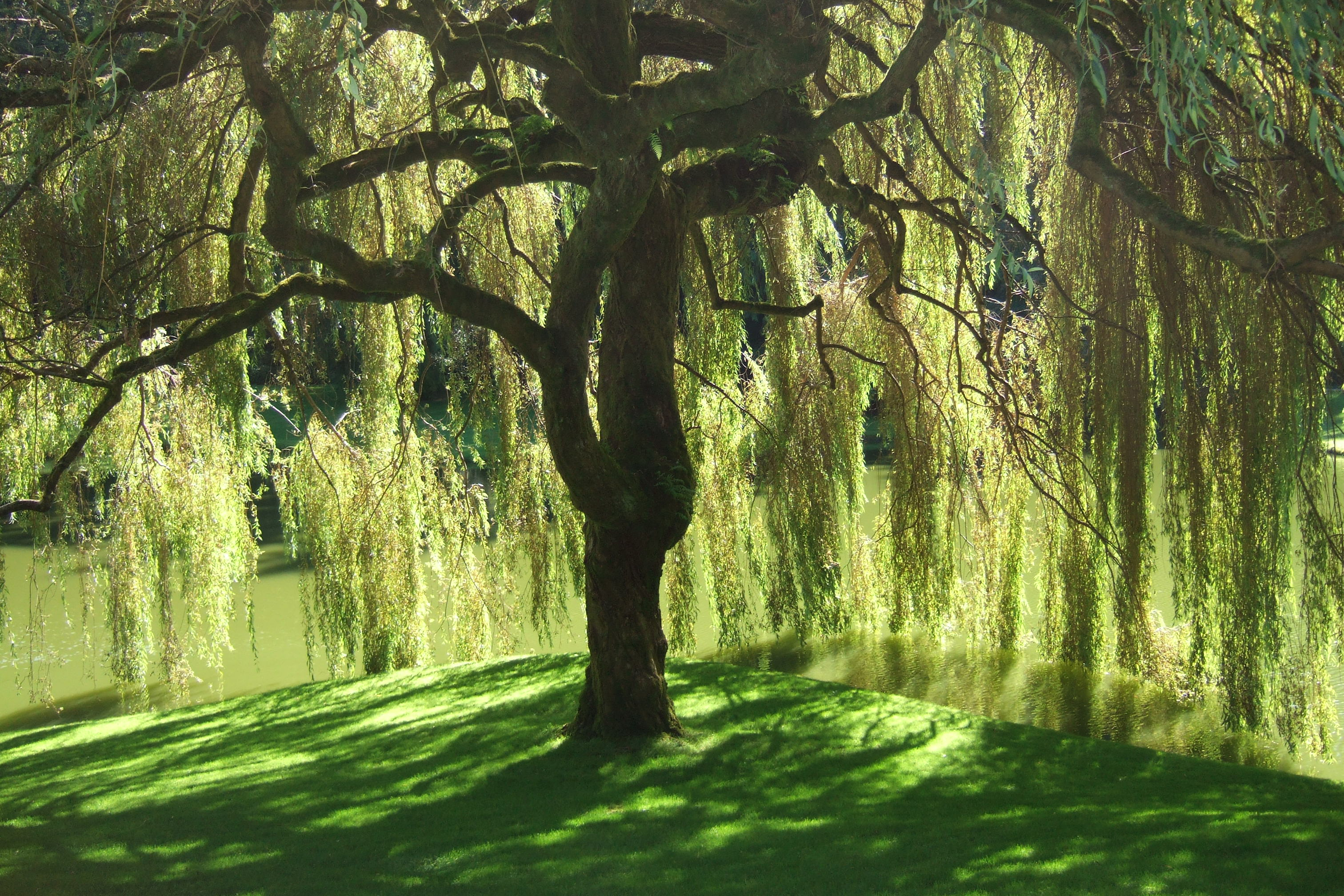
A willow at Bloedel Reserve

Haag received his second ASLA award for his design titled "Sequence of Gardens" at Bloedel Reserved located on Bainbridge Island. The 140-acre (0.57 km^{2}) Bloedel Reserve, deeded to the University of Washington in 1970, was again sold in 1986 to the Arbor Fund. This non-profit corporation hired Haag as head designer for the site in order to maintain the company's dedication to "...developing, maintaining, and managing the reserve for public and educational purposes".

Haag split the land into four main garden quadrants where each 'room' had a specific theme while maintaining their unique qualities that fluidly connected these spaces together. These gardens are described as having been created in pairs—garden one and three; garden two and four.

Garden one and three are noted for their geometric-based designs. The first garden, also known as the Garden of Planes, is described as being the most abstract of the four gardens. Garden 3 is the Reflection Garden which incorporated the use of free-standing walls of yew and the introduction of a pool that used reflection to enhance visual aesthetics.

Gardens two and four, however, exude the theme of life and death. Garden 2, known as the Anteroom. Connects the Garden of Planes and the Reflection Garden. This garden is teeming with mosses, lichens, and ferns and leaves observers with a sense of decay and death. Garden 4, on the other hand, is known as the Bird Sanctuary and is the final garden in the sequence. This garden poses as the opposite of the Anteroom through its use of dark and still waters. The purpose of this garden is to attract various wildlife to its natural-looking design.

== Accolades ==
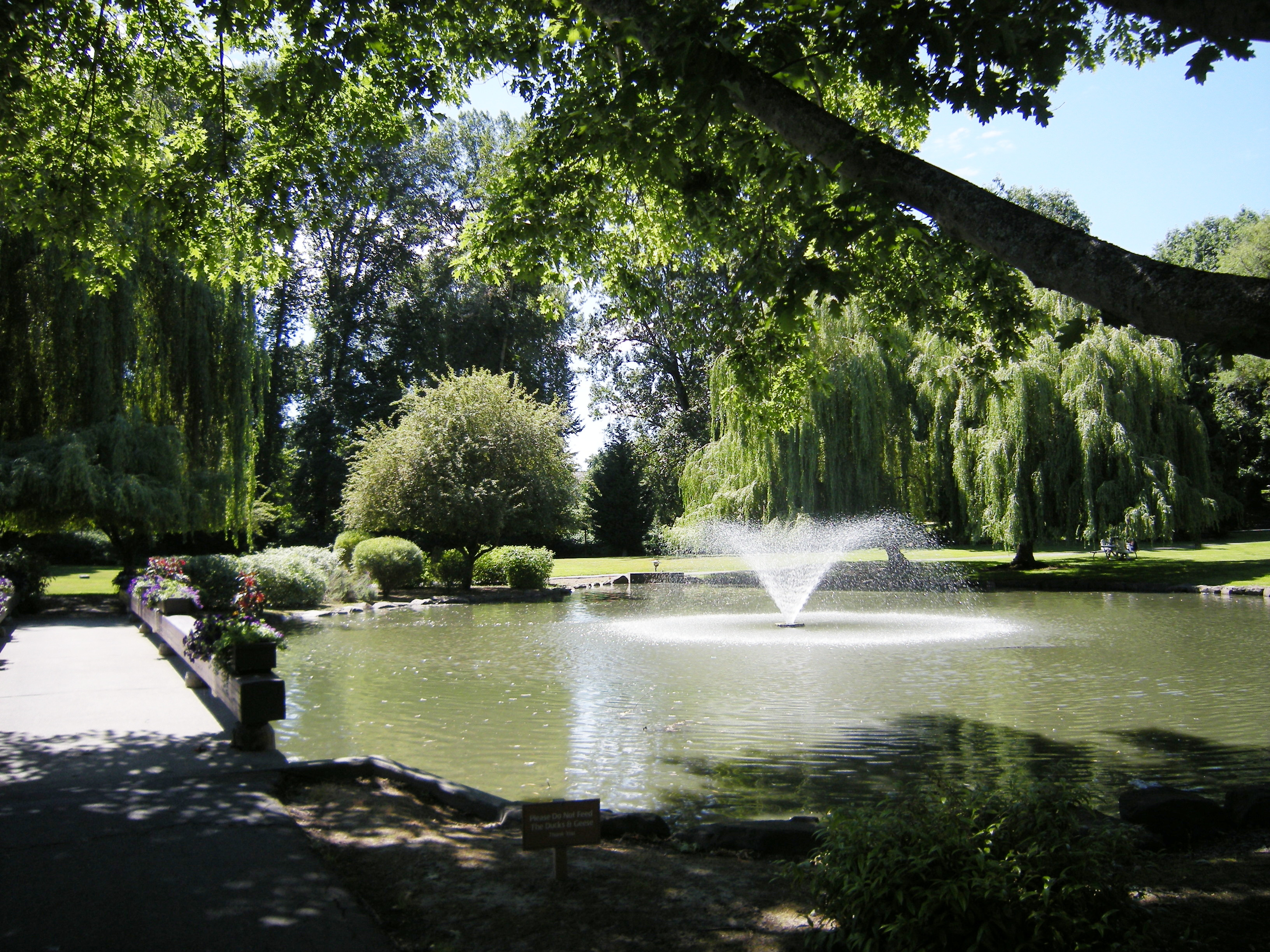
Former Battelle campus in Seattle.

- 2 time recipient of the ASLA President's Award for Design Excellence (only person ever to receive twice)
- Publication: Richard Haag: Bloedel Reserve and Gas Works Park
- Awarded a Fulbright Scholarship in Japan for 2 years
- In spring of 1996 Harvard University Graduate School of Design honored Mr. Haag with a symposium and exhibition entitled 'Exploring the Landscape Architecture of Richard Haag'
- Resident at the American Academy in Rome
- Principal of Richard Haag and Associates
- Founded U.W. Landscape Architecture Department
- Speaker in the Spotlight on Design Lecture Series at the National Building Museum 2001
