= Dafna (given name) =

- Language: Hebrew

Other names
- Variant form: Daphna
- Related names: Daphne

Dafna (Hebrew: דפנה), is a feminine given name. Notable people with the given name include:

- Dafna Bar-Sagi an Israeli-American cell biologist and cancer researcher
- Dafna Dekel, Israeli singer and actress
- Dafna D. Gladman, a Canadian doctor and medical researcher
- Dafna Kaffeman, Israeli artist
- Dafna Lemish, Israeli-American media researcher
- Dafna Linzer, journalist
- Dafna Michaelson Jenet, an Israeli-American politician
- Dafna Rechter, Israeli actress and singer
