= Daphne (disambiguation) =

Daphne is a figure in Greek mythology.

Daphne may also refer to:

== People and fictional characters ==
- Daphne (given name), including a list of persons and fictional characters with the given name
- Daphne (singer), Cameroonian singer Daphne Njie Efundem (born 1986)
- Daphne (Dragon's Lair), a character from the video game Dragon's Lair
- Daphne, stage name of Karen DiConcetto (born 1980), of American pop duo Daphne and Celeste

== Places ==
- Daphne, Alabama, a city in the United States
- Daphne, Texas, unincorporated community in Franklin County, Texas
- A former suburb of the ancient city of Antioch, today Harbiye, Antakya, Turkey
- Constantiana Daphne, Byzantine fortification on Danube
- Daphne (Mount Athos), Greece, likely site of ancient Cleonae
- Daphne (Thrace), a town of ancient Thrace, now in Turkey
- Rablah / Riblah, formerly also known by the name Daphne

== Songs ==
- "Daphne", on several Django Reinhardt albums, such as Djangology; written in 1937
- "Daphne", from the 2002 1 Giant Leap album 1 Giant Leap
- "Daphne", from the 2011 Lia Ices album Grown Unknown
- "Daphne", by the British band Squeeze from their 1995 album Ridiculous
- "Daphne", by Bat for Lashes from the album The Haunted Man
- "Daphne", from the 2001 John Paul Jones album The Thunderthief

== Vessels ==
- HMS Daphne, Royal Navy ships
- Daphné-class submarine, a French Navy class
  - French submarine Daphné (S641), lead submarine of the class
- Daphne-class Seaward Defence Craft, Royal Danish Navy
- Daphne (brig), a ship that was wrecked in 1819
- SS Daphne (1883), a ship which sank disastrously in 1883
- Princess Daphne (ship), a 1954 cruise ship

== Other uses ==
- Daphne (opera), a 1938 opera by Richard Strauss based on the myth and legend of the nymph
- Daphne (2017 film), a British drama film
- Daphne (2007 film), a British biographical drama film
- Daphne (comedy), a British comedy trio
- DAPHNE (emulator), an emulator of Laserdisc arcade games
- Daphne (plant), a genus of shrubs
- Détecteur à Grande Acceptance pour la Physique Photonucléaire Expérimentale, a particle detector
- DAPHNE project, a European Commission-funded project under FP7 research funding
- Ethinylestradiol/cyproterone acetate, a birth control pill
- 41 Daphne, an asteroid

== See also ==
- Daffney (born 1975), American professional wrestler
- Dafney, a surname
- Dafne (disambiguation)
- Dafni (disambiguation)
- Dafny (programming language)
