= Daphne (given name) =

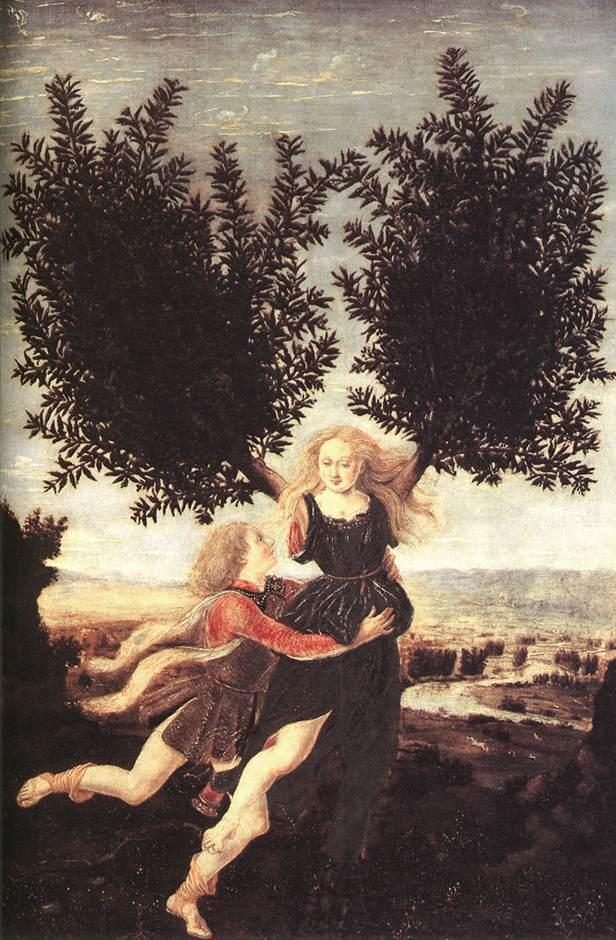
- Apollo and Daphne by Antonio del Pollaiolo.
- Gender: Feminine

Origin
- Origin: Greek
- Meaning: Laurel

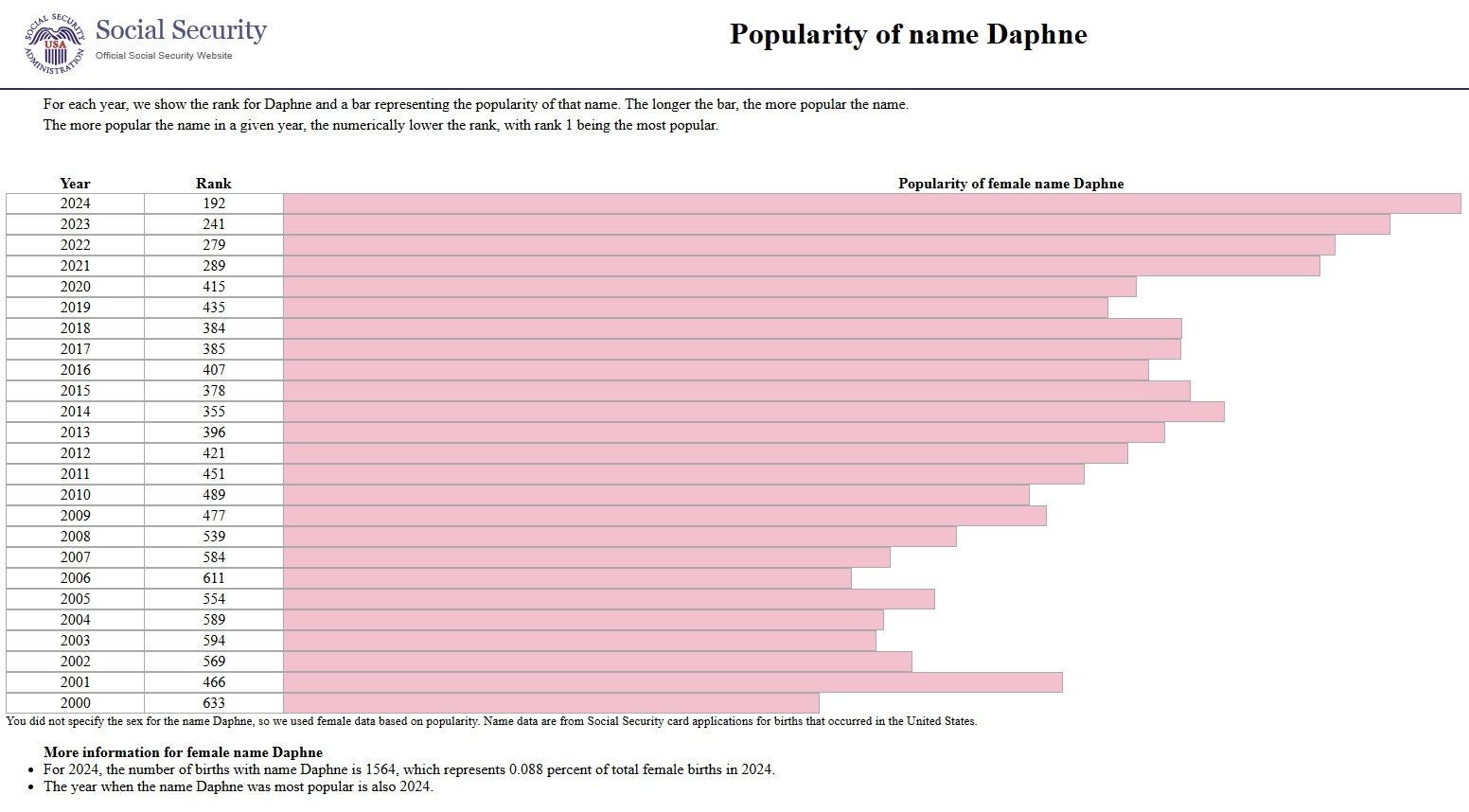
According to the U.S. Social Security Administration the popularity of Daphne as a name in the U.S. has tended to increase from 2000 to 2024, reaching its highest popularity up to that date in 2024

Daphne (or Dafne) is a feminine given name of Greek origin meaning laurel. It originates from Greek mythology, where Daphne (Greek: Δάφνη) was a naiad – a variety of female nymph associated with fountains, springs, streams, and other bodies of freshwater – who was turned into a laurel tree to save her from Apollo's advances.

The name came into popular use in the Anglosphere in the late 19th century along with other flower, tree, and plant names that were in vogue at the time. In the United States, the name was in use for enslaved African-born women named by their enslavers, who used names from the ancient Greek and Roman classics for the enslaved population in order to display their education to their contemporaries. United States census records from the 19th century show a majority of the women bearing the name in the antebellum era were Black Americans. The name was also in rare use in the United Kingdom in the late 18th and early 19th centuries, where a working class mother and daughter in Scotland were both named Daphne. The name became fashionable for daughters born to aristocratic families in Britain in the late 19th century and early 20th century. The name increased in use in the Anglosphere after author Daphne du Maurier rose to prominence in the 1940s and 1950s. Usage also increased after the name was used for characters in novels or television productions such as the popular 1960s American television series Surfside 6 in which Diane McBain played socialite Daphne Dutton, who had her own yacht called the Daffy II. After the show first aired, the name Daphne tripled in use for newborn American girls between 1960 and 1962. In recent years, the name has increased in usage due to the aristocratic character Daphne Bridgerton on the 2020s Netflix streaming television series Bridgerton.

Daphne has been among the one thousand most used names for girls in the United States most years since 1889. It has also been popular in recent years in the United Kingdom, Quebec, Canada, France, and the Netherlands.

== Notable persons ==
=== Daphne ===
- Daphne Akhurst (1903–1933), Australian tennis player
- Daphne Alexander (fl. 2000s–2020s), Cypriot/British actress
- Daphne Allen (1899–1985), English artist
- Daphne Arden (born 1941), British sprinter
- Daphne Ashbrook (born 1963), American actress
- Daphne Barak-Erez (born 1965), Israeli law professor
- Daphne Bavelier, French neuroscientist
- Daphne Berdahl (1964–2007), German anthropologist
- Daphne Botha (born 1948), South African tennis player
- Daphne Brooker (1927–2012), British model, costume designer and fashion professor
- Daphne Brooks (born 1968), American writer and black studies academic
- Daphne Brown (1948–2011), American architect
- Daphne Campbell (born 1957), American politician
- Daphne Caruana Galizia (1964–2017), Maltese journalist, blogger and anti-corruption activist killed by a car bomb
- Daphne Ceeney (1934–2016), Australian Paralympic competitor in multiple sports, first woman Australian Paralympian
- Daphné Collignon (born 1977), French comic book author
- Daphne Courtney (1916–?), South African actress
- Daphne Njie Efundem (born 1989), stage name Daphne (singer), Cameroonian singer
- Daphne du Maurier (1907–1989), English writer
- Daphne Gail Fautin (1946–2021), American professor of zoology
- Daphne Fielding (1904–1997), English socialite and writer
- Daphne Fitzpatrick (born 1964), American artist in multiple media
- Daphne Foskett (1911–1998), English art connoisseur and art writer
- Daphne Fowler (born 1939), English game show champion
- Daphne Gautschi (born 2000), Swiss handball player
- Daphne Gottlieb (born 1968), American performance poet
- Daphne Guinness (born 1967), Irish artist and socialite
- Daphne Lorraine Gum (1916–2017), Australian pioneer in the care and education of children with cerebral palsy
- Daphne Haldin (1899–1973), British art historian
- Daphne Hampson (1944–2021), British theologian
- Daphne Hardy Henrion (1917–2003), British sculptor
- Daphne Hasenjäger (born 1929), South African former sprinter
- Daphne Heard (1904–1983), English actress and acting teacher
- Daphne Iking (born 1978), Malaysian television personality, MC and occasional actress
- Daphne Jackson (1938–1991), English nuclear physicist, first female physics professor in the UK
- Daphne Jennings (born 1939), Canadian politician
- Daphne Jongejans (born 1965), Dutch Olympic diver
- Daphne Jordan (born 1959), American politician
- Daphne Khoo (born 1987), Singaporean singer
- Daphni Leef (born 1986), Israeli social activist
- Daphne Marlatt (born 1942), Canadian poet and novelist
- Daphne Matziaraki, Greek director, writer and producer
- Daphne Mayo (1895–1982), Australian sculptor
- Daphne Alloway McVicker (1895–1979), American writer
- Daphne Merkin (born 1954), American writer
- Daphne Odjig (1919–2016), Canadian First Nations painter
- Daphne Olivier (1889–1950), British Women's Auxiliary Air Force officer during the Second World War awarded the George Cross
- Daphne Oram (1925–2003), British composer, pioneer of electronic music
- Daphne Park (1921–2010), British SOE and MI6 intelligence officer, diplomat and public servant
- Daphne Patai (born 1943), American educator
- Daphne Pearson (1911–2000), British Second World War Women's Auxiliary Air Force officer awarded the George Cross
- Daphne Phelps (1911–2005), British writer
- Daphne Pochin Mould (1920–2014), English photographer, broadcaster, geologist, traveller, pilot and Ireland's first female flight instructor
- Daphne Pollard (1892–1978), Australian-born vaudeville performer and dancer
- Daphne Reynolds (1918–2002), English painter and printmaker
- Daphne Rickson, New Zealand music therapist
- Daphne Robinson (1932–2008), New Zealand cricketer
- Daphne Rubin-Vega (born 1969), American actress
- Daphne Schrager (born 2000), British para-cyclist
- Daphne Sheldrick (1934–2018), founder of the Sheldrick Wildlife Trust
- Daphne Spain, American professor of urban and environmental planning
- Daphne Todd (born 1947), English painter
- Daphne Touw (born 1970), Dutch former field hockey goalkeeper
- Daphne Trimble (born 1953), Northern Irish academic and former politician
- Daphne Walker (figure skater) (born c. 1925), British figure skater
- Daphne Walker (singer) (1930–2025), New Zealand singer
- Daphne Wayans (born 1971), American television personality, former wife of Keenen Ivory Wayans
- Daphne Willis (born 1987), American singer and songwriter
- Daphne Woodward (1906–1965), translator of French and German into English
- Daphne Zuniga (born 1962), American actress

=== Dafne ===
- Dafne Fernández (born 1985), Spanish actress and dancer
- Dafne Keen (born 2005), British-Spanish actress
- Dafne Molina (born 1982), Mexican beauty pageant titleholder
- Dafne Navarro (born 1996), Mexican trampoline gymnast
- Dafne Quintero (born 2002), Mexican archer
- Dafne Schippers (born 1992), Dutch track and field athlete
- Dafne Shimizu (born 1973), Guamanian politician

== Fictional characters ==
- Dafne, from Dafne and the Rest, 2020s Spanish television series
- Daphne Blake, in the Scooby-Doo franchise
- Daphne Clarke, in the Australian soap opera Neighbours
- Daphne Duck, a Disney character
- Daphne Hatzilakos, in the Canadian television series Degrassi: The Next Generation
- Daphne Millbrook, in the television series Heroes
- Daphne Moon, in the television show Frasier
- Princess Daphne (character), in the video game Dragon's Lair
- Daphne (Re:Zero), in the light novel series Re:Zero − Starting Life in Another World

== See also ==
- Dafni § People
- Daphna
- Defne (name)
