= Berdahl =

Berdahl is a surname. Notable people with the surname include:

- Blaze Berdahl (born 1980), American actress, singer, rapper, voice-over actor, announcer and narrator
- Daphne Berdahl (1964–2007), German-born American anthropologist
- Jennifer Berdahl, American sociologist
- Robert M. Berdahl (born 1937), American college and university administrator
