= Defne (name) =

- Gender: Feminine
- Language: Turkish

Origin
- Origin: Greek
- Meaning: Laurel

Defne is a common feminine Turkish given name. Notable people with the name include:

== People ==
=== Given name ===
- Defne Başyolcu (born 2006), Turkish volleyball player
- Defne Joy Foster (1975–2011), American-Turkish actress
- Defne Kayalar (born 1975), Turkish actress
- Defne Samyeli (born 1972), Turkish actress
- Defne Taçyıldız (born 2003), Turkish swimmer
- Defne Tanığ (born 2007), Turkish swimmer

== See also ==
- Dafne (given name)
- Daphne (given name)
- Daphna
