= Dafney =

Dafney is a surname. Notable people with the name include:

- Bernard Dafney (1968–2006), American football player
- Dominique Dafney (born 1997), American football player

== See also ==
- Daffney, ring name of American professional wrestler Shannon Spruill (1975–2021)
- Dafne (disambiguation)
- Daphne (disambiguation)
