= Daphni =

Daphni may refer to:

- Dan Snaith, Canadian musician
- Dafni (disambiguation), places in Greece
- fr:Daphni (fonds d'investissement), French venture capital investment fund
