= Lemish =

Lemish is a surname. Notable people with the surname include:

- Dafna Lemish, Israeli media researcher
- Vladislav Lemish (1970–2021), Azerbaijani footballer
