= Haldin =

Haldin is a surname. Notable people with the surname include:

- Daphne Haldin (1899–1973), British arts historian
- Mats Haldin (born 1975), Finnish orienteering competitor
- Misan Haldin (born 1982), German basketball player of Nigerian origin
- Thomas Haldin (born 1965), Swedish tennis player
