= Daphna Greenstein =

Israeli architect (born 1952)

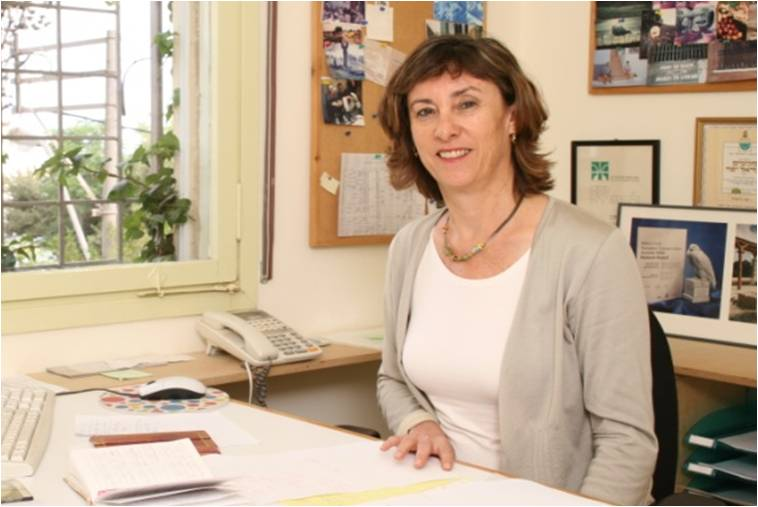
Daphna Greenstein, 2014

Daphna Greenstein (Hebrew: דפנה גרינשטיין; born 1952) is an Israeli architect and landscape architect. Greenstein professioned in various design and planning aspects: landscape architecture, environmental design, and architecture. She specialized in designing a wide range of projects in the public realm.

== Biography ==
Greenstein was born in Haifa. She graduated from the Environmental Design department at the Bezalel Academy, Jerusalem in 1976. Between 1974 and 1980, Greenstein was employed at Shlomo Aronson, landscape architecture firm. In 1983 Greenstein completed her studies at University of Oregon, USA, on a Fulbright Fund, and received her Bachelor of Landscape Architecture (B.L.A) and her Master of Architecture (M.Arch). In 1984 Greenstein established her own firm, engaging in several projects of public space in Haifa and in the north of Israel.

In 1988 Greenstein and Dr. Gil Har-Gil co-founded their firm Greenstein-Har-Gil Landscape Architecture Ltd. The office is located on Mount Carmel, Haifa, and engages in a wide range of projects, mainly for the public sector, on a national, regional and local level. The firm participated in invited and open competitions in Israel and abroad and was awarded several first prizes and citations. The firm was awarded, among others, the Azrieli Prize for urban planning, of the German Colony in Haifa. The Tel-Aviv municipality Karavan Prize, for the Hecht Park in Haifa. Among Greenstein's professional works are urban design projects, infrastructure landscape restorations projects, renewable energy, heritage sites, nature and landscape projects, as well as urban and regional master plans.

Alongside her professional work, Greenstein dedicated substantial time to academic teaching of landscape architecture, as an adjunct professor at the University of Oregon in 2000, and as a senior lecturer, from 1985 till today at the Technion Department of Landscape Architecture in Haifa. She serves as a council member of the Israeli Landscape Architects Association (ISALA) since 1996, as a board member and chairman of ISALA between 2001 and 2004. Furthermore, Greenstein served as a referee in professional landscape and architecture competitions and citations. In 2012 she initiated and co-participated in an art exhibition – "Lines in the Land" with artist Nurit Gur-Lavi. In 2013 she served as the chairperson of the steering committee for the Annual Conference of the Israeli Landscape Architects Association, which took place in Haifa, with over 500 participants.

== Projects ==
Hecht Park

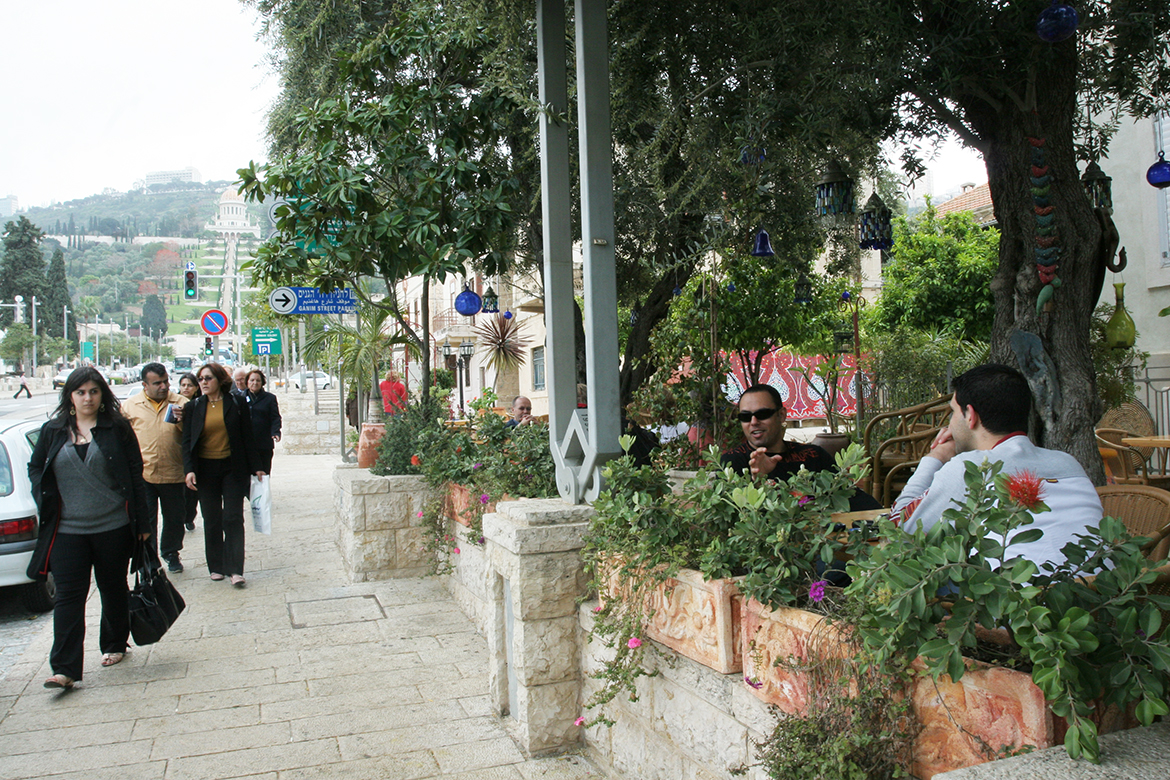
The German Colony

- Haifa, Hecht Park, a linear, urban park, near the sea (Karavan Prize)
- Haifa, Shikmona sea shore promenade
- Haifa, the German Colony, rehabilitation of an historic city quarter (Azrieli Prize)
- Haifa, Wizo square, an urban plaza for the Art & Design Academy, in the German Colony
- Haifa, Hadar Neighborhood, urban renewal, restoration of historic streets
- Tel-Aviv, "Green routes” for pedestrians and cyclists
- Zihkron Ya'acov, “Hamoshava Park”, a central town park
- Kiryat Bialik, "Gan Habanim", a central town park, at the heart of an old neighborhood
- Tel Dan Nature Reserve, landscape restoration and preservation
- Akko, Napoleon Hill, Archeological park
- Beit She'an valley, Springs Park, located along water streams
- Snir River, promenade along the river bed
- Taninim River, interdisciplinary master plan
- Alona, Ancient Water Park, above ancient Roman Underground water channels.
- Tel Hai, open-air museum of historical events
- Cross Israel Highway (6), landscape restoration and tunnel portal design of the northern road sections (30 km)
- Infrastructure National Projects, rails, tunnels, gas lines and wind energy
- Ashdod and Nazareth, Urban Master Plans
- Renewable Energy, Wind turbines and Hydroelectric storage

== Awards ==
- “Karavan” Award of Gardens and Landscape Architecture, Tel Aviv-Jaffo municipality for planning “Park Hecht”, 2009.
- “Azrieli” Prize for Urban Planning, for planning the German Colony in Haifa, 2006.
- "Realizer of a Beautiful Israel“, The Council for a Beautiful Israel, for designing the German Colony, Haifa, 2001.
- “Lifschitz” Prize, Haifa Municipality, for an impressive connection of Haifa's central landscape assets, 1999.
- “Certificate of Appreciation”, The Israeli Architects Association, on the occasion of fifty years of Israeli Architecture, for “professional contribution in the field of Landscape Architecture”, 1998.
- First Prize, Henry Ford Foundation, in the field of heritage and preservation, for the German Colony project in Haifa, 1998.
- “Citation of Building and Construction Center", for "ongoing contribution to increasing awareness of landscape", 1997.
- First Prize, on an invited competition, for designing Ben Gurion Blvd. in the German Colony, 1995.
- Fulbright Fund, Scholarship for advanced studies in USA 1980-1983
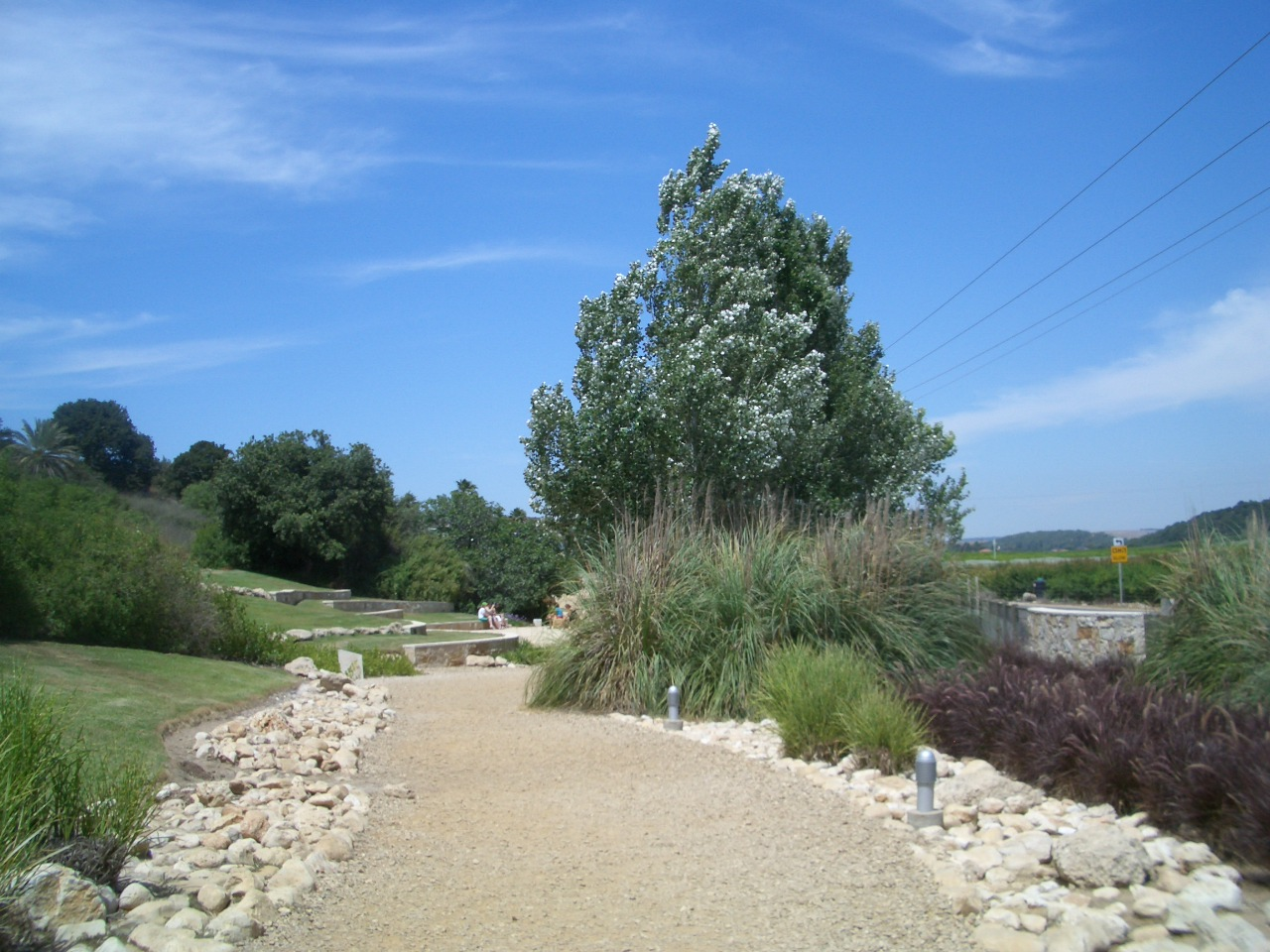
Alona Park, "Ancient Water"

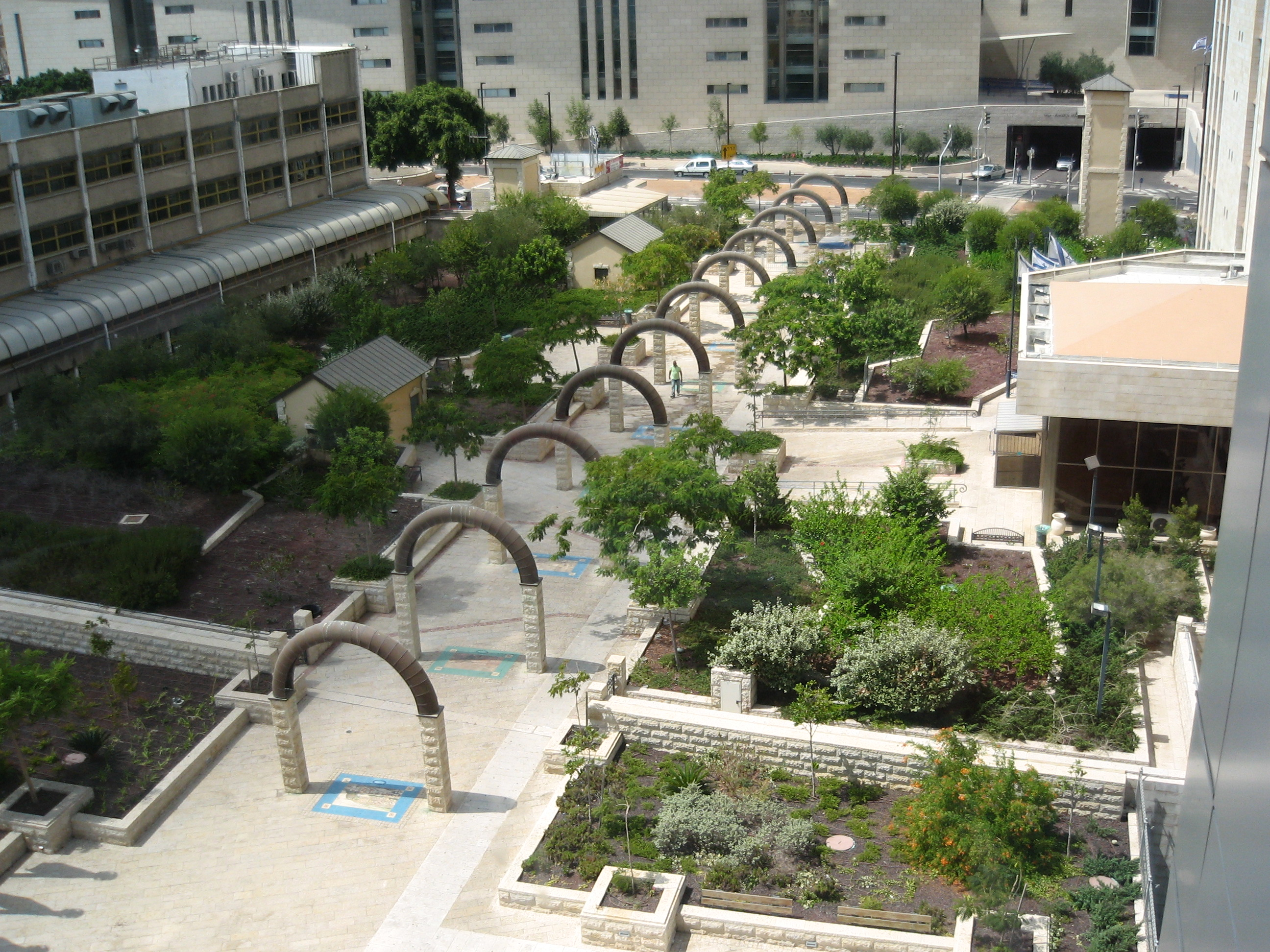
Governmental Campus Garden, Haifa

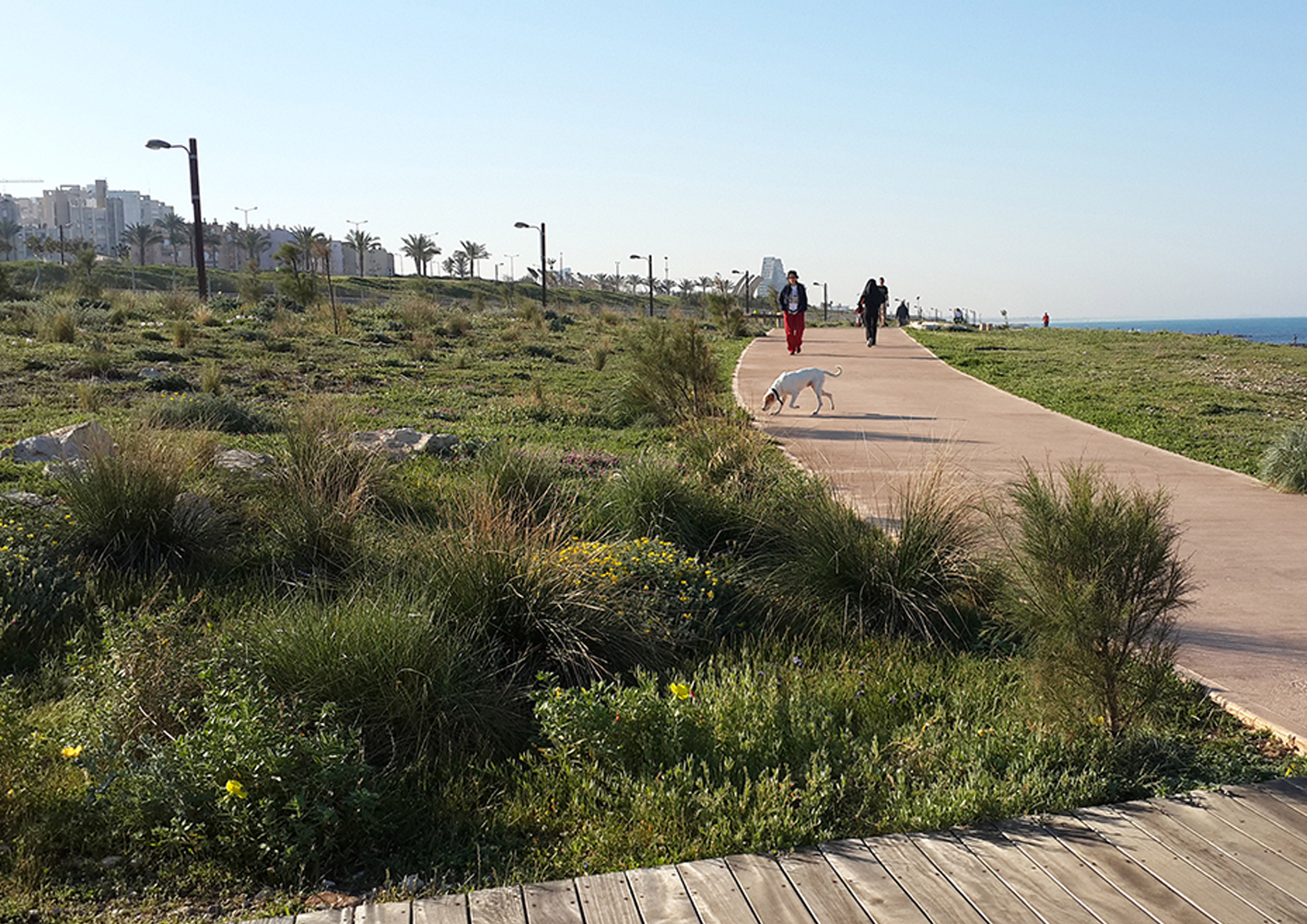
Haifa, Shikmona shore promenade

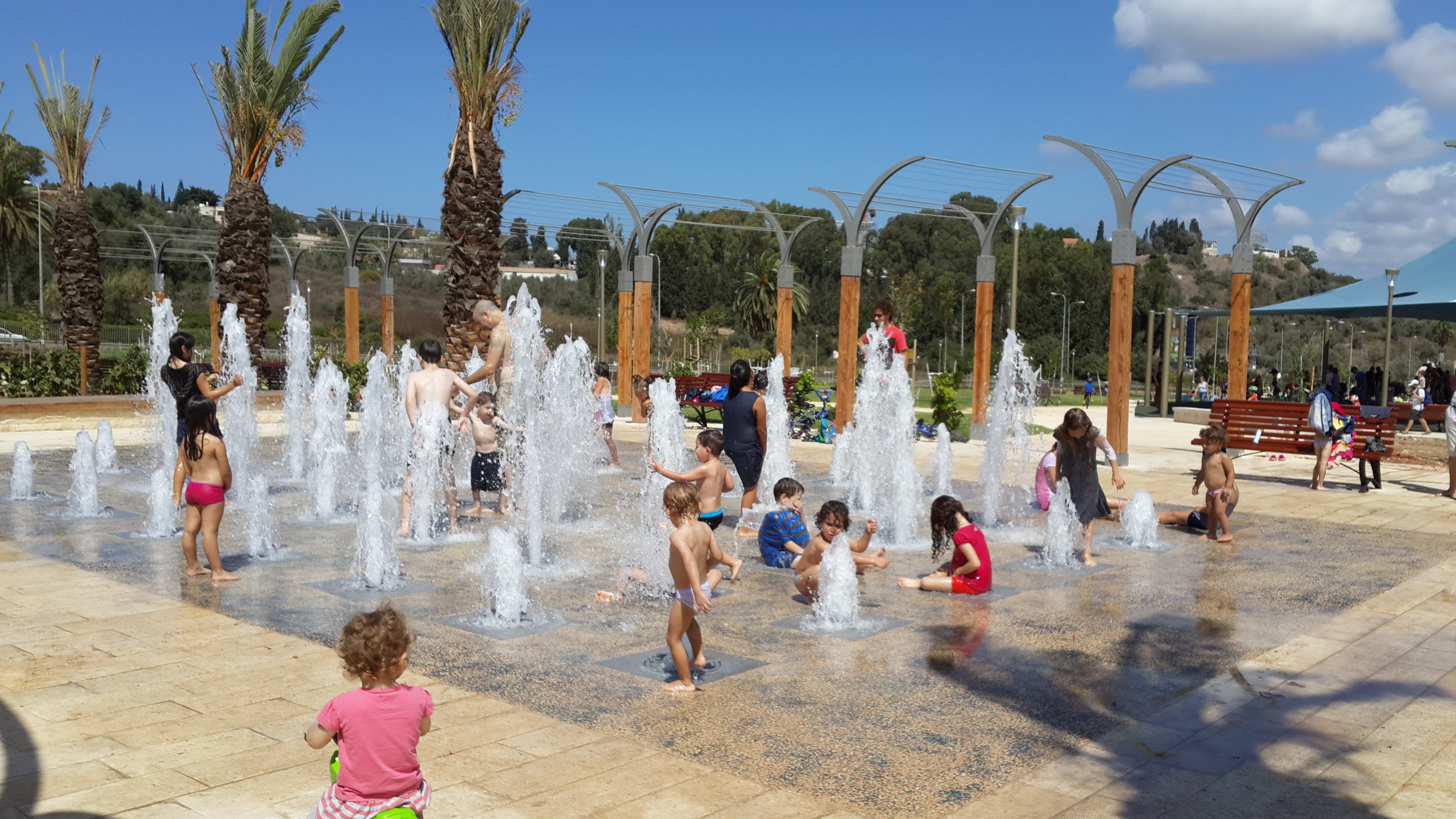
Zihkron Ya'acov, Hamoshava Park

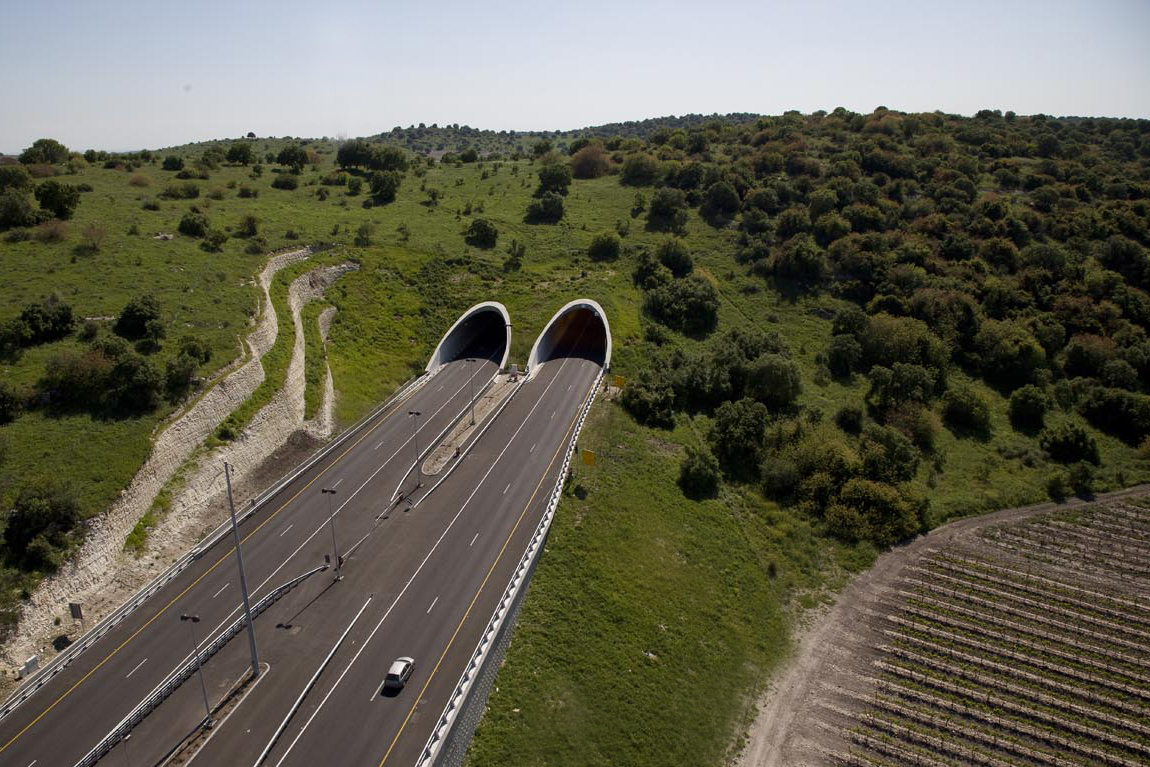
Cross-Israel Highway
