= Dafne (disambiguation) =

Dafne is a 1597 opera by Jacopo Peri.

Dafne may also refer to:

== Arts ==
- La Dafne, a 1608 opera by Marco da Gagliano
- Dafne (Opitz-Schütz), a 1627 opera by Martin Opitz and Heinrich Schütz

== Other uses ==
- Dafne (given name)
- DAFNE, a particle collider in Italy
- Dose adjustment for normal eating, a strategy in insulin therapy

== See also ==
- Adma wa Dafneh, town in Lebanon sometimes transliterated as Dafne
- Dafni (disambiguation)
- Daphne (disambiguation)
