= Dafna Bar-Sagi =

Israeli cell biologist and cancer researcher

- Born: Israel
- Education: State University of New York at Stony Brook, Bar-Ilan University
- Scientific career
- Workplaces: New York University School of Medicine, NYU Langone Health.
- Academic advisors: James Feramisco

Dafna Bar-Sagi is a cell biologist and cancer researcher at New York University School of Medicine. She is the Saul J. Farber Professor in the department of biochemistry and molecular pharmacology and the department of medicine and senior vice president and vice dean for science at NYU Langone Health. Bar-Sagi has been a member of scientific advisory boards, including the National Cancer Institute, Starr Cancer Consortium, and Pancreatic Cancer Action Network.

Her research focuses on the nature of the Ras oncogene and how Ras signaling leads to tumor development, particularly in pancreatic cancer.

== Early life ==
=== Education ===
Dafna Bar-Sagi was born and raised in Israel. She attended Bar-Ilan University where she earned her undergraduate and master's degrees in neurobiology. She received her PhD in neurobiology in the United States from the State University of New York at Stony Brook (SUNY).

=== Career ===
Dafna Bar-Sagi conducted her postdoctoral research in the lab of James Feramisco in Cold Spring Harbor Laboratory, where she worked on the nature of the Ras proteins in 1986, and eventually served as senior staff investigator.

In 1995, Bar-Sagi became faculty at the department of molecular genetics and microbiology at State University of New York (SUNY) at Stony Brook and served as the department chair from 2003 to 2006.

Bar-Sagi transitioned to NYU Langone Medical Center in 2006 as chair of the department of biochemistry. She became vice dean for science and chief scientific officer at NYU Langone Health in 2011. She became executive vice president in 2019.

== Research ==
Dafna Bar-Sagi's research began in 1986, while completing her postdoctoral work with Dr. James Feramisco in Cold Spring Harbor. Bar-Sagi and Feramisco were the first to observe how Ras protein facilitates cellular uptake of nutrients through macropinocytosis.

Bar-Sagi continues to study the function of Ras oncogenes and mutant Ras proteins in cell proliferation, survival, nutrient uptake, cell metabolism and tumorigenesis, particularly in pancreatic cancer. Recent studies in the Bar-Sagi lab have focused on the treatment of mutant KRAS cancer cells, and understanding how they withstand targeted therapies, as well as identification of novel therapeutic strategies for Ras-driven cancers. Her research on interleukin-1β suggests that to fully understand the interactions between tumors, their environment, and immune system, researchers will have to find new methods of studying tumors in vivo.

== Selected publications ==
Recent Publications
Year	Citation
2018	Cullis, Jane; Das, Shipra; Bar-Sagi, Dafna. Kras and Tumor Immunity: Friend or Foe? Cold Spring Harbor Perspectives In Medicine. 2018 Sep 04; 8(9):
2018	Handler, Jesse; Cullis, Jane; Avanzi, Antonina; Vucic, Emily A; Bar-Sagi, Dafna. Pre-Neoplastic Pancreas Cells Enter a Partially Mesenchymal State Following Transient TGF-î² Exposure. Oncogene. 2018 Aug 02; 37(31):4334-4342
2018	Aiello, Nicole M; Maddipati, Ravikanth; Norgard, Robert J; Balli, David; Li, Jinyang; Yuan, Salina; Yamazoe, Taiji; Black, Taylor; Sahmoud, Amine; Furth, Emma E; Bar-Sagi, Dafna; Stanger, Ben Z. EMT Subtype Influences Epithelial Plasticity and Mode of Cell Migration. Developmental Cell. 2018 Jun 18; 45(6):681-695.e4
2017	Jang, Jung-Eun; Hajdu, Cristina H; Liot, Caroline; Miller, George; Dustin, Michael L; Bar-Sagi, Dafna. Crosstalk Between Regulatory T Cells and Tumor-Associated Dentritic Cells Negates Anti-Tumor Immunity in Pancreatic Cancer. Cell Reports. 2017 Jul 18; 20(3):558-571
2017	Cohen, D J; Grabocka, E; Bar-Sagi, D; Godin, R; Leichman, L P. A Phase lb Studying Combining Irinotecan With AZD1775, A Selective WEE 1 Kinase Inhibitor, in RAS/RAF Mutated Metastatic Colorectal Cancer Patients Who Progressed on First Line Therapy [Meeting Abstract]. Journal Of Clinical Oncology. 2017 Jun 20; (2017):
2017	Fehrenbacher, Nicole; Tojal da Silva, Israel; Ramirez, Craig; Zhou, Yong; Cho, Kwang-Jin; Kuchay, Shafi; Shi, Jie; Thomas, Susan; Pagano, Michele; Hancock, John F; Bar-Sagi, Dafna; Philips, Mark R. The G Proteined-Coupled Receptors GPR31 Promotes Membrane Association of KRAS. Journal Of Cell Biology. 2017 Jun 15; 216(8):2329-2338
2017	Cullis, Jane E; Siolas, Despina; Avanzi, Antonina; Barui, Sugata; Maitra, Anirban; Bar-Sagi, Dafna. Macropinocytosis of Nab-Paclitaxel Drives Macrophage Activation in Pancreatic Cancer. Cancer Immunology Research. 2017 Jan 20; 5(3):182-190
2017	Grabocka, Elda; Bar-Sagi, Dafna. Stress Granules in Pancreatic Cancer: Drug & Resistance Treatment. Oncology Times. 2017; 39(4):30-34
2013	Commisso C, Davidson SM, Soydaner-Azeloglu RG, Parker SJ, Kamphorst JJ, Hackett S, Grabocka E, Nofal M, Drebin JA, Thompson CB, Rabinowitz JD, Metallo CM, Vander Heiden MG, Bar-Sagi D. Macropinocytosis of protein is an amino acid supply route in Ras-transformed cells. Nature. 2013 May 30;497(7451):633-7.
2012	Pylayeva-Gupta Y, Lee KE, Hajdu CH, Miller G, Bar-Sagi D. Oncogenic Kras-induced GM-CSF production promotes the development of pancreatic neoplasia. Cancer Cell. 2012 Jun 12;21(6): 836–47.

== Awards and honors ==
- 2020, Member, National Academy of Sciences
- 2019, Fellow, American Association for Cancer Research (AACR)
- 2018, AACR-Women in Cancer Research Charlotte Friend Memorial Lectureship, AACR
- 2016, Outstanding Investigator Award, National Cancer Institute for cancer research in RAS mutations
- 2014, Pancreatic Cancer Action Network Grant Recipient
- 2008, Pancreatic Cancer Action Network Grant Recipient

== Membership on Scientific Advisory Boards and Boards of Directors ==
- National Cancer Institute Board of Scientific Advisors, Chair 2021
- Starr Cancer Consortium Scientific Review Board
- Pancreatic Cancer Action Network Scientific and Medical Advisory Board
- AACR Board of Directors, 2016-2019
