= Daphne Spain =

American academic

Daphne Spain is an American academic who studies urban and environmental planning. She is the James M. Page Professor in the Department of Urban and Environmental Planning at the University of Virginia.

Spain received her B.A. in sociology from the University of North Carolina, Chapel Hill in 1972, followed by an M.A. and Ph.D. from the University of Massachusetts, Amherst in 1974 and 1977 respectively. In 1995 she joined the editorial board of the Journal of Planning Education and Research, and in 2002 joined the board of the Journal of the American Planning Association. She became a Russell Sage Foundation Visiting Scholar in 1995, and was awarded the Cavalier's Distinguished Teaching Professorship in 2013. Her books include Constructive Feminism: Building Women's Rights into the City, Gendered Spaces, and How Women Saved the City.
