= Iasonion =

Town of ancient Thrace

Coordinates: 41°02′37″N 29°00′07″E

Iasonion or Daphne was a town of ancient Thrace, inhabited during Roman and Byzantine times.

Its site is located near Beşiktaş in European Turkey.
