= Détecteur à Grande Acceptance pour la Physique Photonucléaire Expérimentale =

DAPHNE (Détecteur à Grande Acceptance pour la Physique Photonucléaire Expérimentale) was designed by the DAPNIA department of the Commissariat à l'Energie Atomique, in collaboration with the Istituto Nazionale di Fisica Nucleare. The original purpose of the detector was to explore the quantum chromodynamics (QCD) properties of nucleons (i.e. protons and neutrons). To explore these properties, excitation states of the nuclei require to be measured (e.g. Delta baryons, symbol Δ). These excited states of nucleons decay via the emission of light mesons such as pions (π), eta mesons (η) or kaons (K). Various models exist that describe the correlation between the observed reactions, the excited states and QCD.

DAPHNE was built to observe charged light mesons from the decay of excited nucleon states. The excitation of nuclei can be done with either pion scattering, or real photon scattering on the nucleon. Real photon scattering has the advantage that the first vertex can be cleanly described by the well known quantum electrodynamics (QED), while for the pion scattering at least two strong interaction vertices exist that require much more effort from models.

The detector was used by the Commissariat à l'Énergie Atomique in– Saclay, France (accelerator SATURNE, 19871990) and the Institut für Kernphysik in Mainz, Germany (accelerator MAMI, 1990–2003).

== Setup ==
Two different schematic views of the detector DAPHNE. Perpendicular to the beam line (left) and along the beam line (right).

DAPHNE is a cylinder symmetric detector that was built to detect mainly charged particles from excited nucleons. Its construction is made in such way that a high coverage both in momentum and angular space is provided. The angular range of the detector is Ω = 0.94 × 4π steradians. The detector consists of six layers of organic scintillators divided into 16 segments and is cylinder symmetric. These scintillators were originally produced by Nuclear Enterprises. The following table shows the set-up of one of the 16 identical sectors of DAPHNE, starting from the most inner layer.

DAPHNE Detector Layers
Layer	Material	Thickness	Distance (from center)	Length
A	NE 110	10 mm	161 mm	865 mm
B	NE 102A	100 mm	222 mm	1417 mm
C	NE 102A	5 mm	280.5 mm	1469.3 mm
	Fe	5 mm	299 mm	1645 mm
	Pb	4 mm	303.5 mm	1645 mm
D	NE 102A	5 mm	309.5 mm	1700 mm
	Pb	4 mm	316 mm	1645 mm
E	NE 102A	5 mm	322.5 mm	1708 mm
	Al	4 mm	328.5 mm	1645 mm
F	NE 102A	5 mm	334.5 mm	1720 mm

The 16 sectors represent the calorimeter. To identify particles, the multilayered structure represents a range telescope that allows to determine the energy deposit in each layer and the range of a particle in the detector at all. By the energy losses in each layer and the distribution of energy losses over the layers, the type of particle and its total energy can be determined. This identification is done in a way that measured values are compared to simulated values of particle hypothesis. The maximum likelihood method is used to evaluate which particle hypothesis fits the best to the measured data. The algorithm used checks for proton and charged pion signatures.

For a better identification of the observed reaction, DAPHNE is provided with three concentric and independent multiwire proportional chambers. By analysis of data of the chambers it is possible to safely identify up to five different tracks of charged particles for each identified event. A reconstruction uncertainty of 0.2 degrees (azimuthal) and 2 mm (along the beamline) is provided. The chambers are located around the target place, which is in the very center of the detector. The tracks from the chambers are used to calculate the kinematics of a photoproduction reaction. The main information extracted is the path of the proton and the path of charged pions. This information can also be used to reconstruct missing particles that failed getting identified due to detector angular or momentum acceptance or due to the efficiency of the calorimeter.
