= DAPHNE platform =

The DAPHNE platform, or DAta-as-a-service Platform for Healthy lifestyle and preventive mediciNE, is an ITC ecosystem that uses software platforms, such as HealthTracker, to track individual health data on users or patients so that health service providers can provide personalised guidance remotely to the users or patients in terms of health, lifestyle, exercise and nutrition. It is led by Treelogic SL and partially funded by the European Union 7th Framework Programme for information and communication technology research. The project is listed in the European Commission CORDIS project listings.

== Description ==
DAPHNE is an acronym for ‘DAta-as-a-service Platform for Healthy lifestyle and preventive mediciNE’ with the objective to develop and test methods for utilising personal activity and fitness information. According to a 2016 article in Procedia Computer Science, the DAPHNE platform and project was developed in response to "growing concerns about obesity". DAPHNE purpose was to develop a digital ecosystem using information and communications technology (ITC) through software such as HealthTracker, to connect patients and their physicians remotely. provide a means for remote personal guidance from the Physicians can review a patient or user's data and provide guidance and feedback regarding obesity prevention. Health care providers can monitor their patients "health parameters, medical history and physical condition" and give guidance related to "health, lifestyle, exercise and nutrition." The goal of DAPHNE is to promote a "combination of a healthy and balanced diet, an active lifestyle and regular exercise". The project aims to develop data analysis platforms for collecting, analysing and delivering information on physical fitness and behaviour. Standardised data platforms are being designed to help hardware and software developers to provide personalised health information to individuals and to their health service providers.

== Background ==
Initial EU funding covered the period from 2013 to 2016.

== DAPHNE Project outputs ==
Project outputs will include (i) advanced sensors which can link directly to mobile phones to acquire and store data on lifestyle, behaviour and the surrounding environment; (ii) intelligent data processing for the recognition of behaviour patterns and trends; (iii) software platforms for linking individual health data to health service providers for personalised guidance on healthy lifestyle and disease prevention and to contribute to Big Data services.

=== HealthTracker ===
The HealthTracker can automatically detect a user's physical activity such as "lying down, sitting down, standing up, walking, running and cycling".

== DAPHNE Project Consortium ==
- Treelogic (Coordinator) – Spain
- IBM Israel
- ATOS Spain S.A.
- University of Leeds UK
- Evalan BV, the Netherlands
- Ospedale Pediatrico Bambino Gesù, Italy
- Universidad Politécnica de Madrid, Spain
- SilverCloud Health Ltd, Ireland
- World Obesity Federation, UK
- Nevet Ltd, Israel (division of Maccabi Group Holdings)
