= Daphne Willis =

American singer

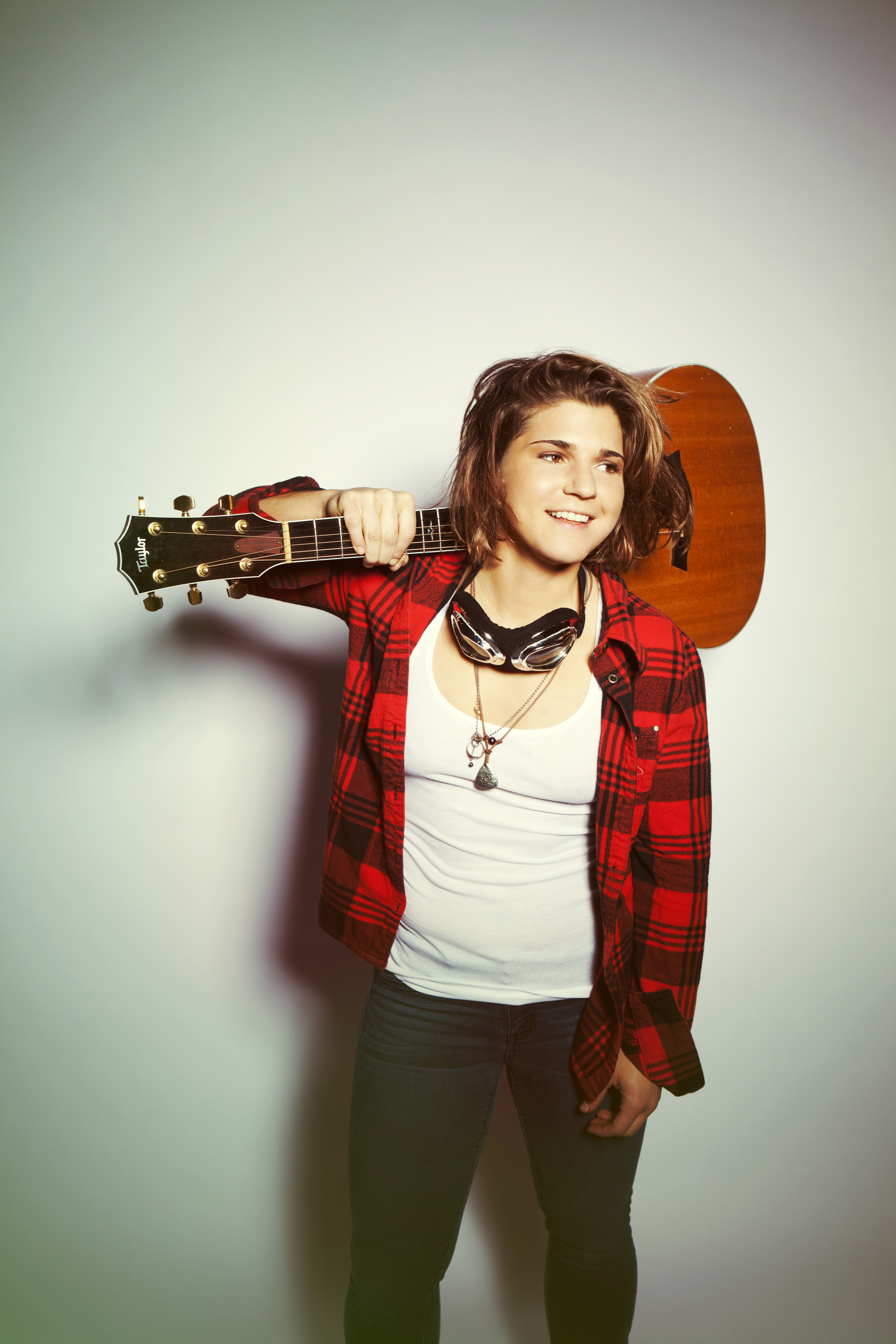

Background information
- Born: 1987 (age 38–39); San Antonio, Texas, U.S.
- Origin: Los Angeles, California, U.S.
- Genres: Alternative Pop
- Occupations: Musician, Singer/Songwriter
- Instrument: Guitar
- Years active: 2005–present
- Labels: Independent, Vanguard Records [Peer Records]
- Website: Daphne Willis Website

Daphne Willis (born March 10, 1987) is a singer and songwriter residing in Los Angeles, California.

== Early life ==
Willis was born in San Antonio, Texas in 1987. Willis grew up in a musical family. Her mother studied classical vocal performance at the University of Texas where her father was an audio engineering major and worked at CBS Records/Sony Music for more than 30 years. The Willis family moved to Chicago, Illinois in 1989 where Willis attended grade school and then studied English and Secondary Education at DePaul University.

== Career ==
Willis began singing at a young age but did not start playing guitar until her high school years. As a student at DePaul, Willis began performing at open mics, which progressed to ongoing local Chicago performances and, eventually, the decision to leave school and go on the road. A touring band was formed and Willis toured extensively performing over 200 shows a year across the Midwest. In September 2007, Willis' first EP Matter of Time was released independently.

Vanguard Records head Kevin Welk heard one of Willis' songs on an American Airlines flight and sent A&R rep Gary Paczosa to Chicago to meet her. After signing a deal with Vanguard Records in 2008, Willis released her second EP, Exhibit A. In the latter half of 2009, Willis headed for the Tennessee hills to begin writing and recording her first full-length album. What to Say was released in 2010. The album was co-produced by Tim Lauer and Grammy Award-winning Gary Paczosa. "My Shoes", a track from this record was featured on ABC's Switched at Birth.

Album number two, Because I Can, was produced by Tim Lauer and released in 2011 on Vanguard Records. Shortly after the release, Willis was interviewed on NPR's Weekend Edition Saturday with Host Scott Simon. Because I Can reached the #2 spot on iTunes Top 40 Singer/Songwriter Chart. The track titled "Sad" was featured on the CW Network One Tree Hill. Trevor Hall makes a guest appearance on the track titled "Circumstances".

Willis parted ways with Vanguard in early 2012 and produced an independent CD, Live to Try, in 2014, which was largely co-written with John Oates, who also plays guitar and sings on the album.

In 2015, Willis signed a publishing deal with Sony ATV. In the fall of 2015, she released an EP, Get It, featuring the hit single Done With Being Done, co-written with Meghan Trainor.

== Discography ==
- Matter of Time (EP), 2007
- Exhibit A (EP), 2008
- What to Say, 2010
- Because I Can, 2011
- Spread Music (EP), 2013
- Live to Try, 2014
- Get It (EP), 2015
- Come Together (EP), 2016
- Freaks Like Me, 2017
- Awake Now, 2020
- Essentials, 2021
- What Might Have Been, 2024
