= Jennifer Berdahl =

Professor of sociology

Jennifer Berdahl is a professor in the department of sociology at the University of British Columbia, in Vancouver, Canada. Prior to that she was a business school professor for 20 years, at the Haas School of Business at the University of California, Berkeley, at the Rotman School of Management at the University of Toronto, and at the Sauder School of Business at the University of British Columbia. Berdahl was raised in Eugene, Oregon, Princeton, New Jersey, and Göttingen Germany and studied at the University of Illinois at Urbana–Champaign, where she received a Ph.D. in social psychology in 1999. She specializes in research related to gender and diversity in the workplace.
