= Daphna =

Daphna is a given name. Notable people with the name include:

- Daphna Dove (born 1975), American musician
- Daphna Greenstein (born 1952), Israeli landscape architect
- Daphna Kastner (born 1961), Canadian actress, screenwriter and director
- Daphna Oyserman American-Israeli Professor of Psychology
- Daphna Poznanski-Benhamou (born 1950), French politician

== See also ==
- Daphne (given name)
