= Dafni =

Dafni (Greek: Δάφνη or Δαφνί, both deriving from the Greek word for "laurel") may refer to:

== Greek places ==
- Dafni, Achaea, part of the municipal unit of Paia, Achaea
- Dafni, Aetolia-Acarnania, part of the municipal unit of Naupactus, Aetolia-Acarnania
- Dafni, Arcadia, part of the municipal unit of Valtetsi, Arcadia
- Dafni, Mount Athos
- in Attica:
  - Dafni, Attica, a municipal unit and a suburb of Athens
    - Dafni BC is also the name of a Division A2 professional basketball club located therein
  - Dafni, Chaidari is a quarter of Chaidari
    - Dafni also refers to the Daphni Monastery, located here
- Dafni, Boeotia, part of the municipal unit of Dervenochori, Boeotia
- Dafni, Corfu, part of the municipal unit of Agios Georgios, Corfu
- Dafni, Corinthia, part of the municipality of Nemea, Corinthia
- in Elis:
  - Dafni, Amaliada, part of the municipal unit of Amaliada
  - Dafni, Vouprasia, part of the municipal unit of Vouprasia
- Dafni, Evrytania, part of the municipal unit of Viniani, Evrytania
- Dafni, Kozani, part of the municipal unit of Tsotyli, Kozani regional unit
- Dafni, Laconia, part of the municipal unit of Faris, Laconia
- Dafni, Lemnos, part of the municipal unit of Atsiki, Lemnos island
- Dafni, Pella, part of the municipality of Skydra, Pella regional unit
- Dafni, Phthiotis, part of the municipal unit of Ypati, Phthiotis
- Dafni, Icaria, part of the municipal unit of Evdilos, Icaria island
- Dafni, Serres, part of the municipal unit of Achinos, Serres regional unit
- Dafni, Xanthi, a village in Xanthi regional unit

== People ==
- Daphni (musician), one of the stage names of the musician Daniel Snaith
- Dafni Bokota (born 1960), greek singer and presenter
- Galia Dafni, Canadian mathematician

== See also ==
- Dafne (disambiguation)
- Daphne (disambiguation)
