= Gil Har-Gil =

Israeli landscape architect

Gil Har-Gil גיל הר-גיל
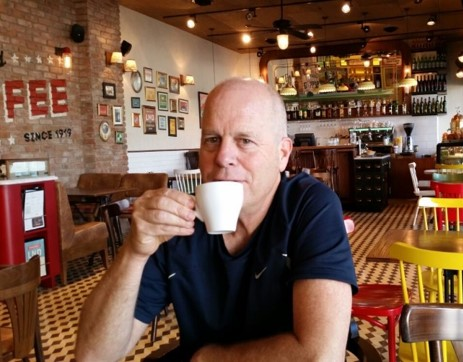
- Education: Bezalel Academy of Art and Design in Jerusalem; Cornell University, New York; Technion - Israel Institute of Technology
- Occupation: Architect
- Practice: Landscape Architect

Gil Har-Gil (Hebrew: גיל הר-גיל) is an Israeli landscape architect.

== Biography ==
Gil Har-Gil was born in Tel Aviv in 1953. He studied architectural design at the Bezalel Academy of Art and Design in Jerusalem. After completing his studies in 1979, he began working as a planner at a Construction Center in Tel Aviv. A few years later, he earned a master's degree (M.L.A) in landscape architecture from Cornell University in Ithaca, New York, where he also worked on landscape planning at the New York State Park Service. During his studies, he received a certificate of appreciation for "Outstanding contribution and support in the development of educational programs."

After graduating from Cornell University, Har-Gil worked as an assistant professor at the Department of Environmental Design at Kansas State University. During this time, he also worked as a planning consultant for the city of Manhattan's development project. Upon his return to Israel, Har-Gil pursued his doctoral studies and received his PhD in urban and regional planning from the Technion – Israel Institute of Technology`s Faculty of Architecture and Town Planning in 1992. During this time, Har-Gil continued to teach in the Department of Landscape Architecture and was appointed, in 2016, associate professor at the Technion's Faculty of Architecture and Town Planning.

In 1988, he established, with landscape architect Daphna Greenstein, the firm "Greenstein Har-Gil, Landscape Architecture and Environmental Planning" where he acquired his fame and publicity as a landscape architect engaged in a wide range of projects, including landscape planning of residential neighborhoods, urban design, urban renewal, regional planning, planning and design of Urban parks, nature parks, heritage and cultural landscape, national parks, national infrastructures such as roads, railways and power lines and architectural design of bridges.

Over the years Har-Gil, his partners, and the firm's staff have received numerous awards, certificates of appreciation, and commendations, including the Tel Aviv Municipality's Karavan Prize for Garden and Landscape Architecture for the planning of Hecht Park in Haifa and the Azrieli Prize of Urban Planning for designing the German Colony in Haifa.

Along with his professional work as a landscape architect, Har-Gil held several public posts. Among them are the chairman of the Israeli Association of Landscape Architects (ISALA), a representative of Israel in the International Association of Landscape Architects (IFLA), and chair of juries and judges in professional contests.

Har-Gil currently leads the cooperative management of Greenstein Har-Gil, Landscape Architecture and Environmental Planning firm.

== Selected works ==
- Hecht Park, Haifa (Karavan Prize, 2009)
- Colony Park, Zichron Yaakov (Design Award, 2016)
- Archaeological Park, Ein Keshatot (National Heritage Site)
- Shikmona Sea Promenade, Haifa.
- The German Colony, Haifa (Azrieli Prize, 2006)
- Moreshet (Neighborhood, 5,000 residential units), Modi'in
- Neot Afek (Neighborhood, 4,500 residential units), Kiryat Bialik
- Saar (Neighborhood,1,800 residential units), Nahariya
- The Colony (Neighborhood, 2,000 residential units), Tiberias
- Hadar, urban renewal and rehabilitation of historic streets, Haifa
- Green Roads, East Tel-Aviv
- Trans-Israel Highway (Landscape Architecture Award, 2014)
- The Sons Park, Kiryat Bialik
- Tel Dan, Nature Reserve
- Banias, National Park
- Gan Hashlosha (Hashana), National Park
- Tel Napoleon, Archaeological Site, Acre
- Springs Park, Springs Valley Regional Council
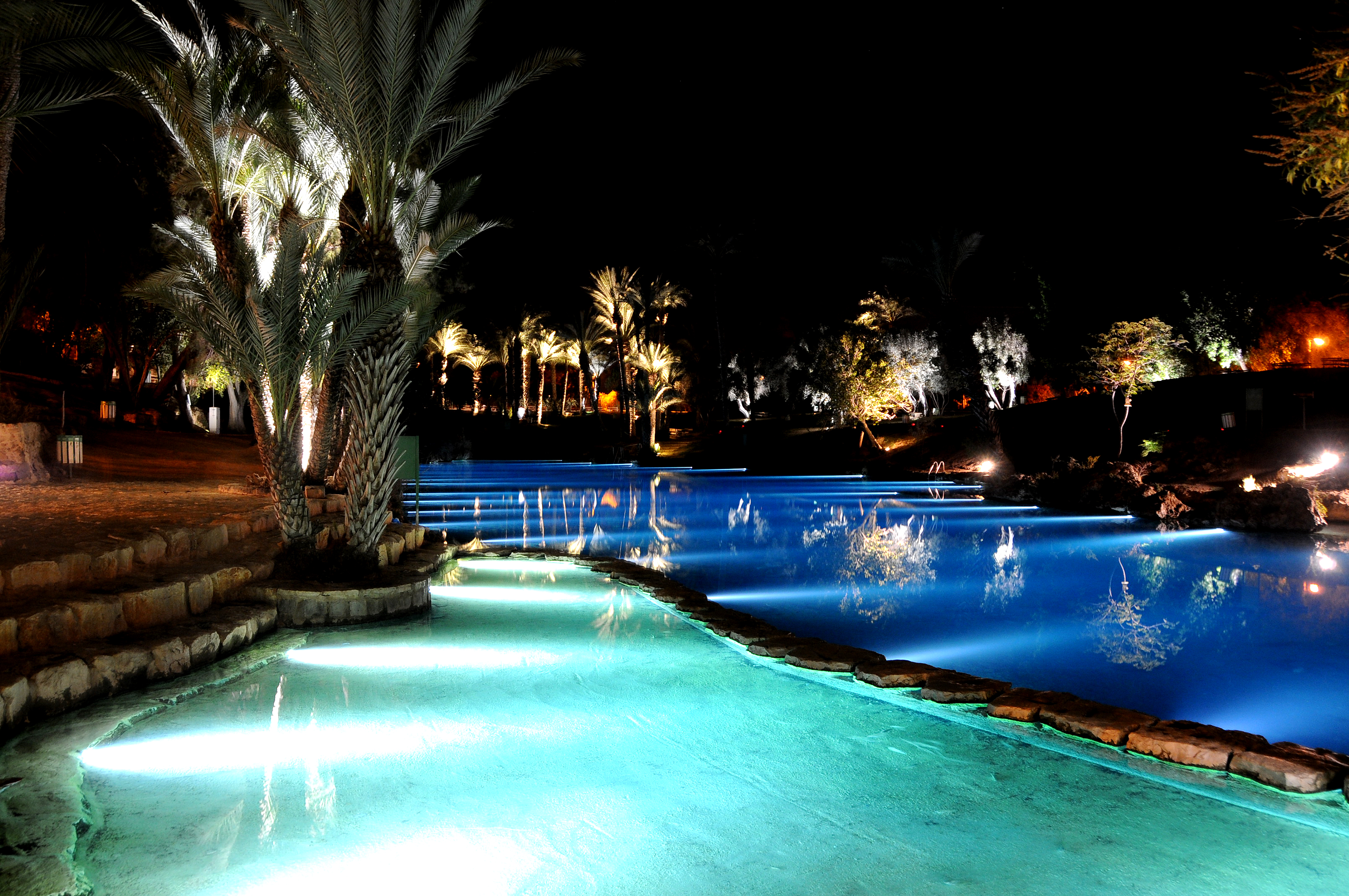
Gan HaShlosha, National Park

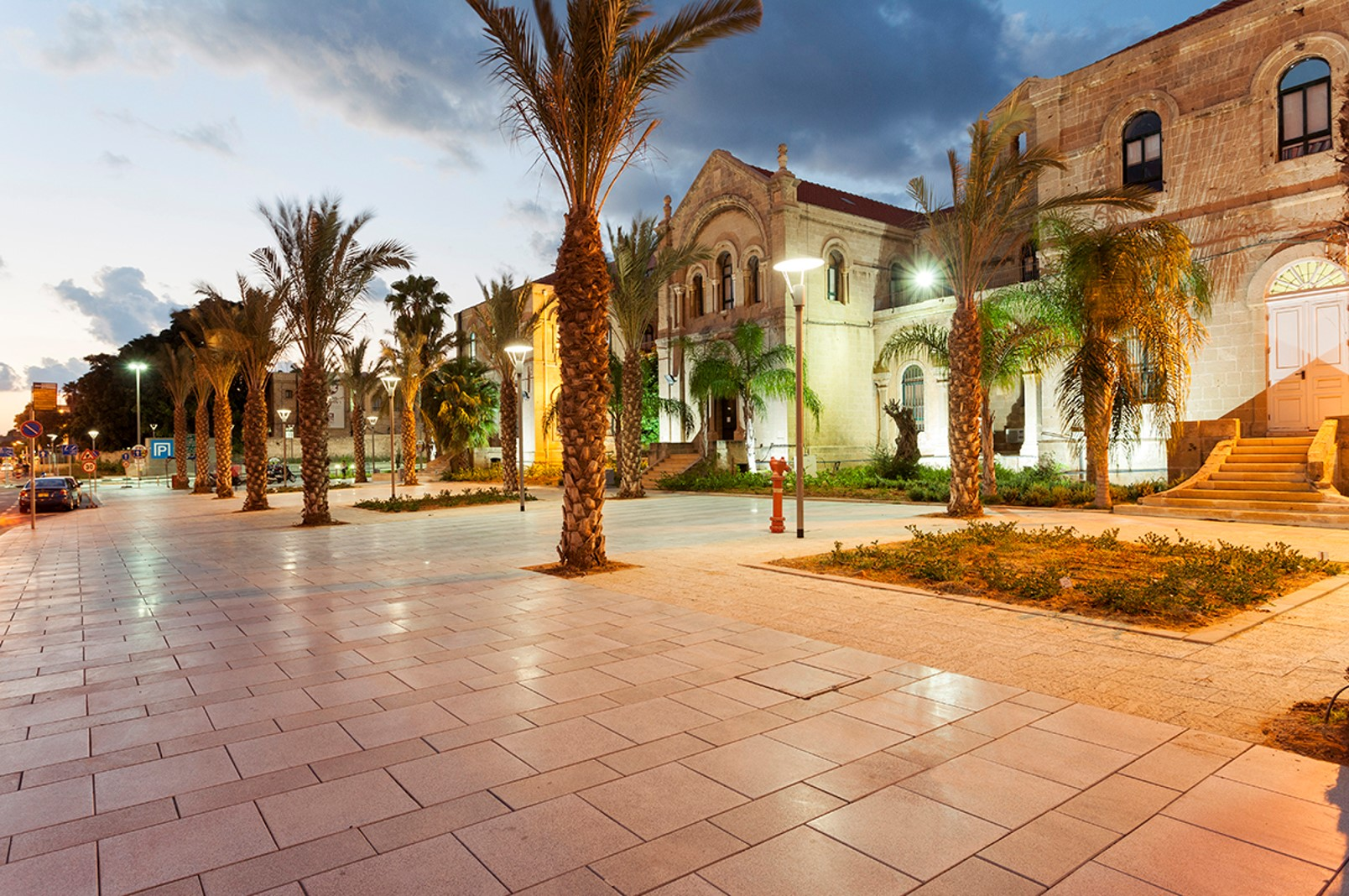
Monastery Square, Bat Galim

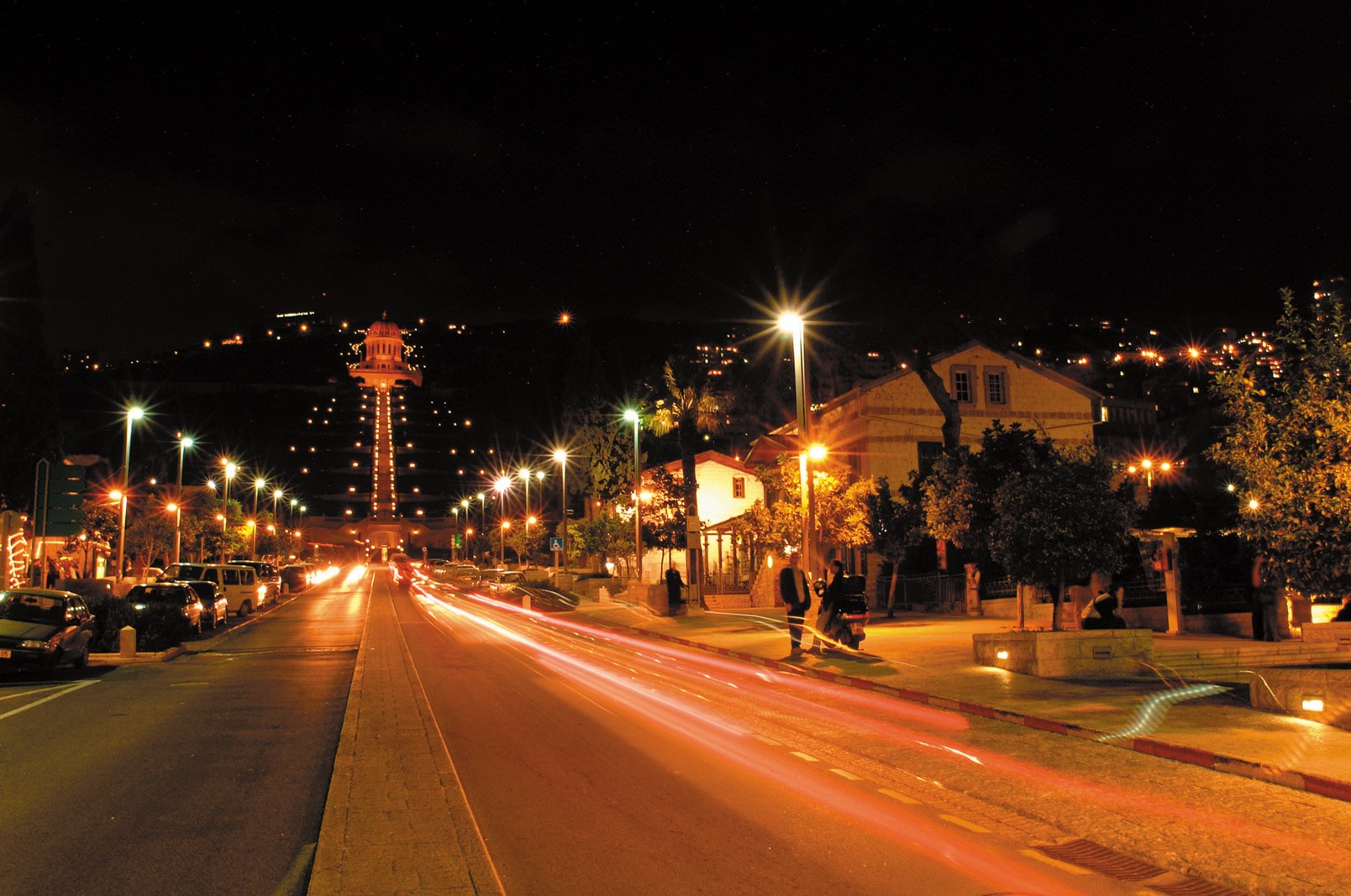
The German Colony, Haifa

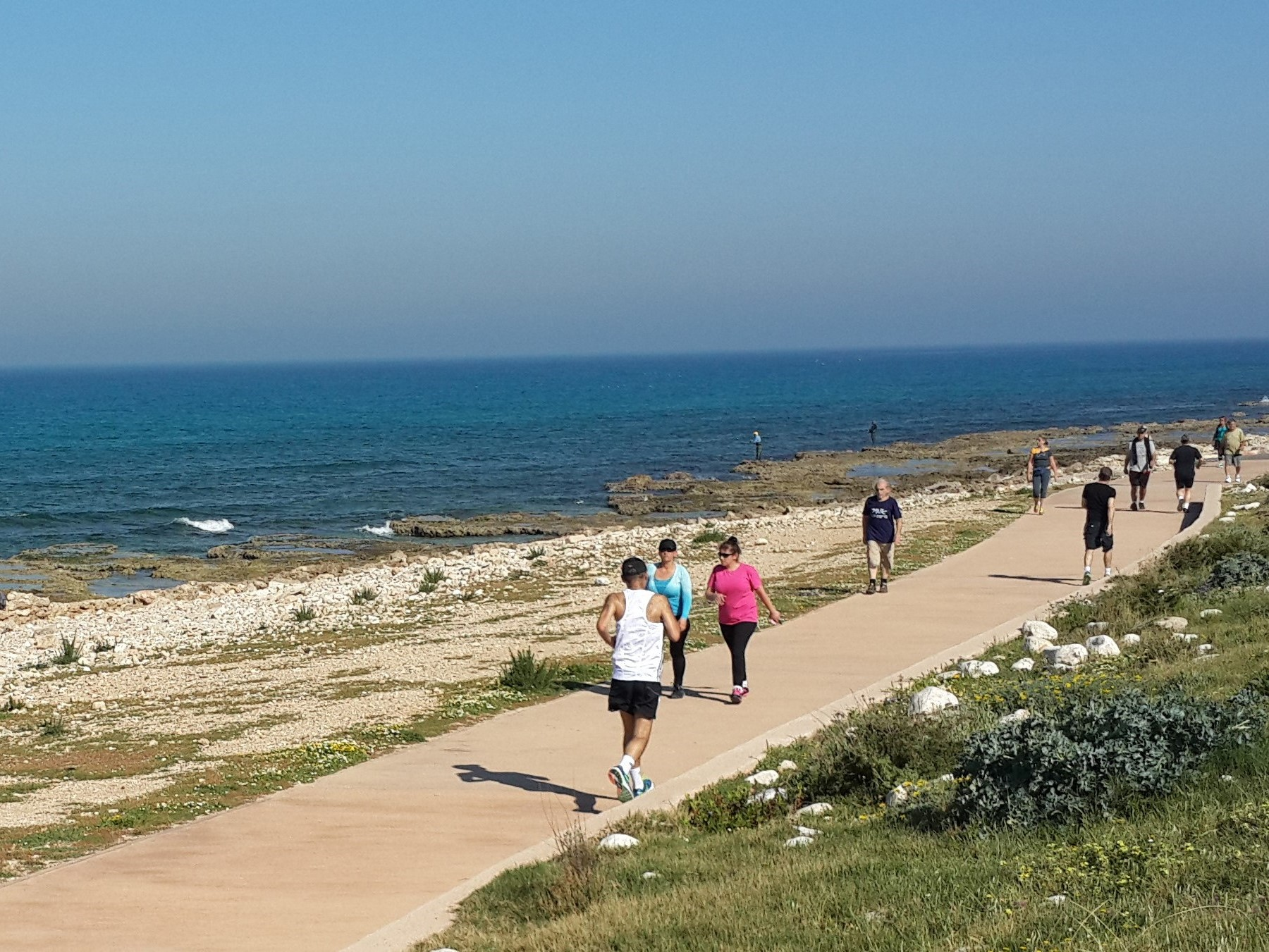
Shikmona Promenade, Haifa

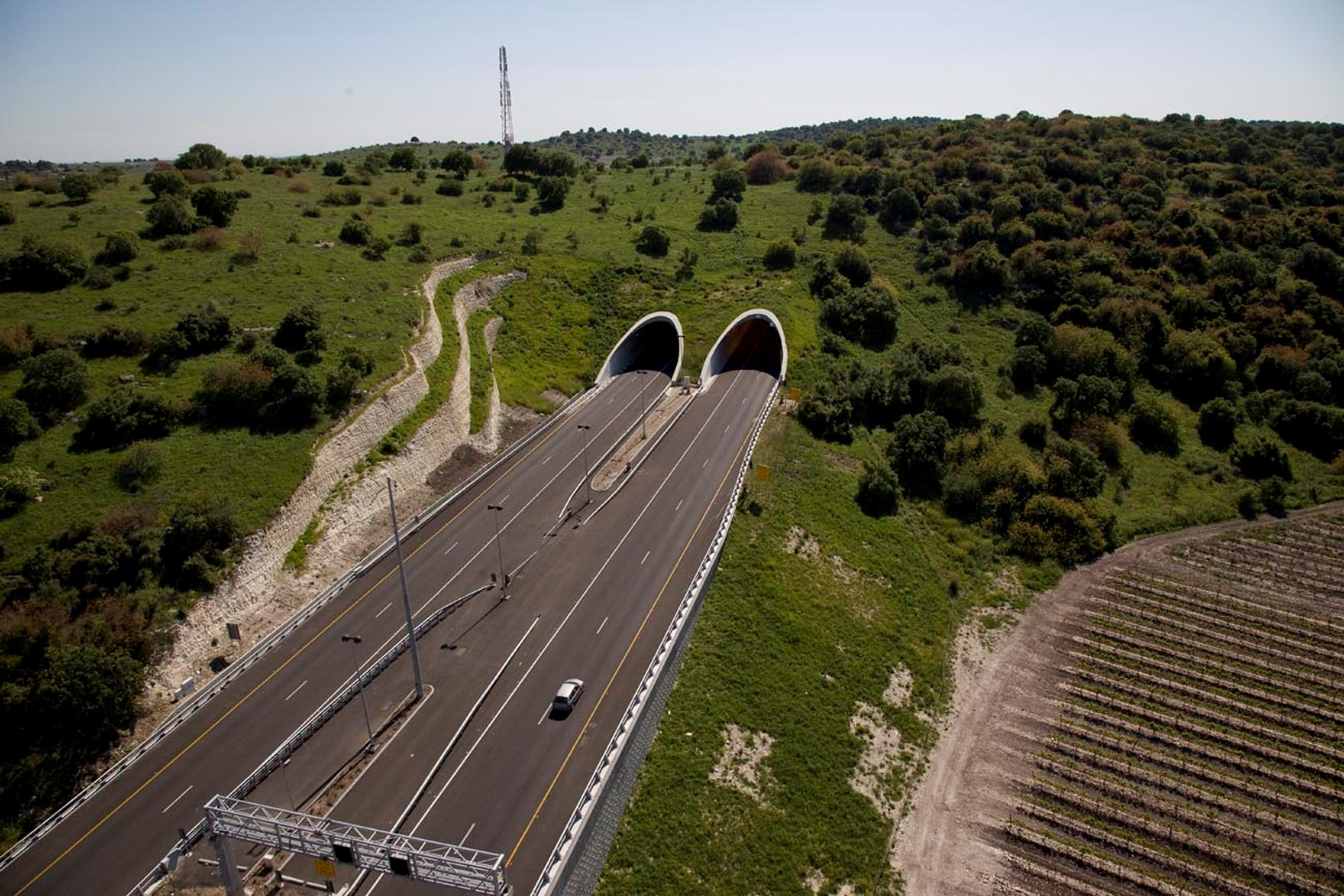
Trans-Israel Highway (Route No. 6)

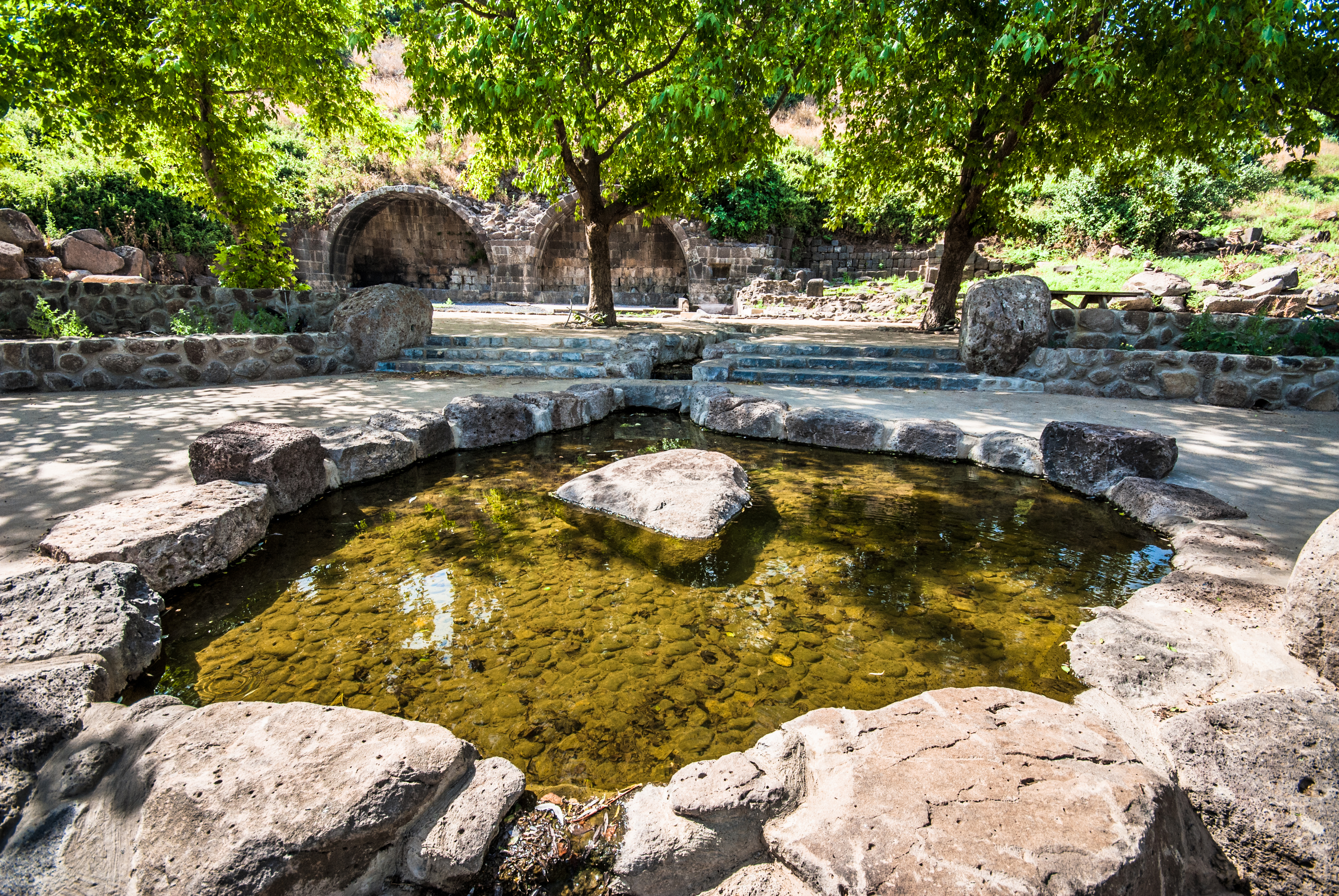
Ein Keshatot, National Heritage Site

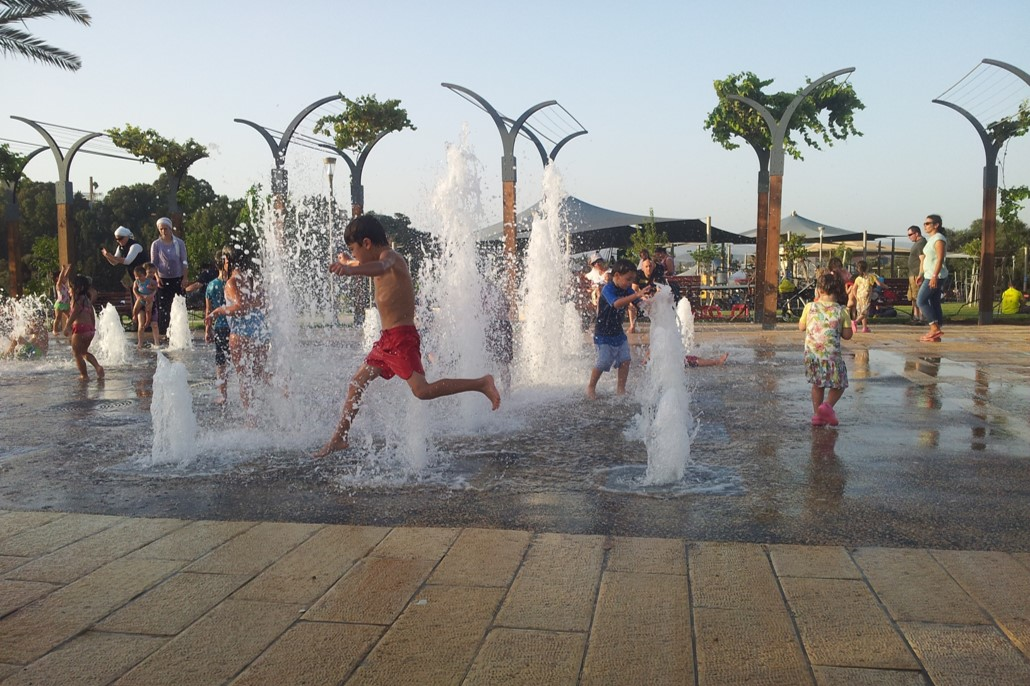
Colony Park, Zichron Yaakov

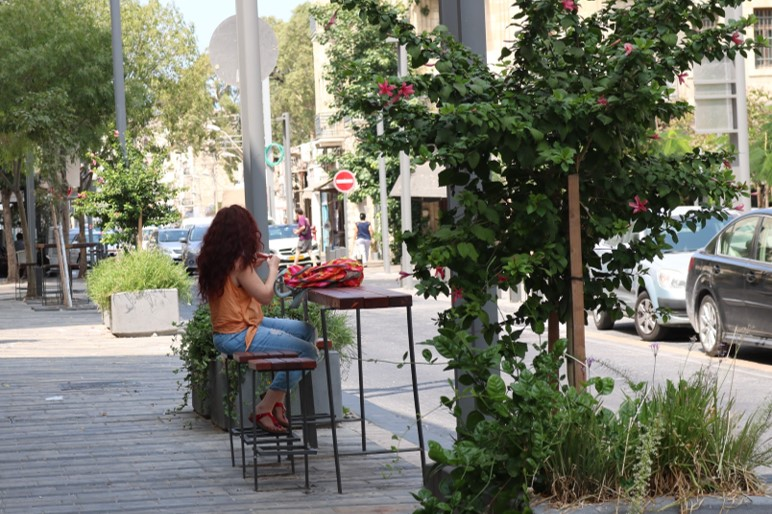
Jaffa Street, Lower City, Haifa

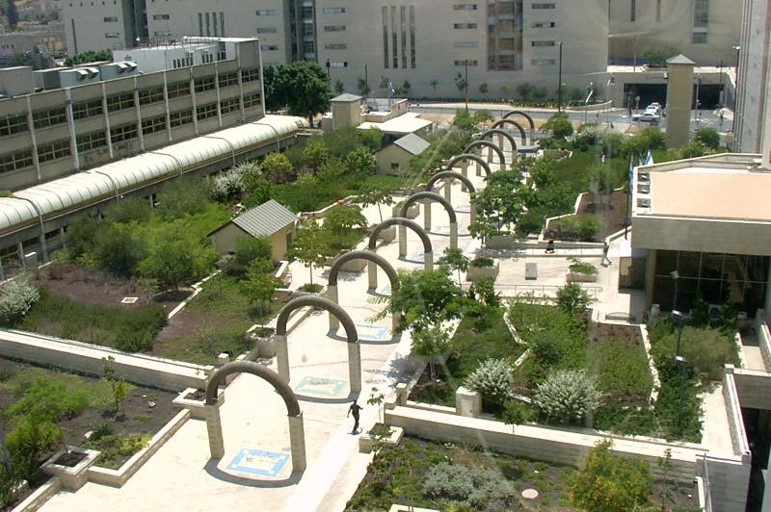
District Government Center Garden, Haifa

== Awards and honors ==
- Karavan, Garden and Landscape Architecture Prize, Tel Aviv Municipality, for creating Hecht Park in Haifa, 2009
- Azrieli Urban Developing Prize, Council for a Beautiful Israel, for developing the German Colony in Haifa, 2006
- First Prize, Northern Finger Park competition, Givat Shmuel Municipality, 2022
- Design Award, Design Award Association, for developing the Colony Park in Zichron Yaakov, 2016
- Landscape Architecture Award, Israeli Association of Landscape Architects, for developing the Trans-Israel Highway, 2014
- Landscape Architecture Award, Israeli Association of Landscape Architects, for A Forest and Reserve Plan, 2014
- Realizing a Beautiful Israel, Council for a Beautiful Israel, for developing the German Colony in Haifa, 2001
- Lifshitz Prize, Haifa Municipality, for an Impressive Connection of Haifa's Central Landscape Assets, 1999
- Certificate of appreciation, Society of Architects, for professional contributions to landscape architecture, 1998
- Heritage and Conservation Prize, Ford Foundation, for the German Colony Project, 1998
- Darling Award, Construction Center, in recognition of ongoing contribution to increasing landscape awareness, 1997
- First Prize, Invited Competition, Ben-Gurion Axis, Haifa Municipality, and Others, 1995

== Publications ==
Full list of publications

=== Publications in International professional magazines and journals ===
- G. Har-Gil, D. Greenstein and T. Mark, "Park Hecht and Park Shikmona, Haifa, Israel", Topscape Pasage, an international magazine dedicated to the contemporary landscape, Italy, November 2016
- G. Har-Gil, "Green landscape architecture for the benefit of the environment", JOKOPOST, Internet Magazine, July 2014
- G. Har-Gil, D. Greenstein "The Urban Revival of The German Colony in Haifa", Topos Magazine, Germany, August 2009
- G. Har-Gil, "Paesaggio Costiero, Sviluppo Turistico Sostenibile", Annalisa Maniglio Calcagno edt. Roma, Italy, Gangemi Publishers, 2009
- G. Har-Gil, A. Barnet, "From the Annual European Seminar of IFLA", Landscape Architects Association Journal, No. 28, February 2008
- G. Har-Gil, "The lost Colony", Cornell Alumni Magazine, January–February 2007
- G. Har-Gil, D. Greenstein, "Israeli Landscape Architecture", ACD – Magazine of Architecture Construction & Design, Moscow, Russia, November 2005
- G. Har-Gil, "Rehabilitation of Ben Gurion Boulevard in the German Colony, Haifa", Alumni Magazine, Cornell University, N.Y., U.S.A, 2002
- G. Har-Gil, D. Greenstein, "Art of Integrating Archeology, Religion and Nature in Landscape Architecture", Art and Landscape, George L. Anagnstopoulos, (ed.) Panayotis and Effie Michelis Foundations, Athens, Greece, 1998

=== Publications in Israeli professional Magazines and Journals ===
- Har-Gil, G., "The Kibbutz Garden of Mishmar Haemek in the absorption of Nahal Oz evacuees", Landscape Architecture – Bulletin of the Israeli Association of Landscape Architects, February 2024
- Har-Gil, G., "Spatial Guidelines and Street Language: A Tool for Planning Landscape Aspects", Buildings – Monthly Journal of the Construction Industry, September–October 2017
- Har-Gil, G., D. Greenstein, O. Mor, " The Valley Railway Promenade ", Galila – Northern District Bulletin, Council for the Preservation of Heritage Sites in Israel, March 2017
