= Dafni, Kozani =

Dafni Δάφνη
- Community
- Location within Greece
- Coordinates: 40°17′7″N 21°8′55″E
- Country: Greece
- Administrative region: Western Macedonia
- Regional unit: Kozani
- Municipality: Voio
- Municipal unit: Tsotyli

Population (2021)
  - Community: 34
- Time zone: UTC+2 (EET)
  - Summer (DST): UTC+3 (EEST)

Dafni (Greek: Δάφνη, before 1927: Δράμιστα – Dramista, between 1927 and 1930: Μακρυπλαγιά – Makryplagia), part of the municipal unit of Tsotyli, is a small town located in the far west of the Kozani regional unit, itself in the Greek region of Macedonia.
