= Dafne Shimizu =

Chamorro politician from Guam

Director of Revenue and Taxation of Guam
- In office January 17, 2019 – November 26, 2023
- Governor: Lou Leon Guerrero
- Preceded by: John Camacho
- Succeeded by: Marie Lizama (acting)

Personal details
- Born: Dafne Mansapit; October 1, 1973 (age 52)
- Education: University of Guam (BS, MPA)

Dafne Mansapit-Shimizu is a Chamorro politician from Guam. She was appointed the Director of Guam Department of Revenue and Taxation (DRT) on 17 January 2019. According to Governor Lou Leon Guerrero, under Mansapit-Shimizu's leadership the DRT had administered "some of the most ambitious and broadly impactful programs ever implemented by any agency in our island’s history".

During the COVID-19 pandemic this included the administration of emergency payments and the extension of child tax credit. She has also worked to enforce the collection of unpaid taxes across Guam, by improving technical infrastructure and human resourcing. She is Vice Chairperson of the Cannabis Control Board in Guam, which legalised the use of recreational cannabis in April 2019.

Shimizu resigned as Director of Revenue in November 2023 to assume a new position as comptroller of the Antonio B. Won Pat International Airport Authority.

Political offices
Preceded by John Camacho	Director of Revenue and Taxation of Guam; 2019–2023	Succeeded by Marie Lizama; Acting
