= Daphne Berdahl =

American anthropologist

- Born: June 14, 1964; Freiburg, Germany
- Died: October 5, 2007 (aged 43); Saint Paul, Minnesota, United States
- Occupation: Anthropology Professor

Daphne Berdahl (June 14, 1964 – October 5, 2007) was an anthropologist known for her work on Eastern Germany and Post-socialist Europe. Her work on gender and consumption as well as her writing on post-communist nostalgia has been widely cited by scholars of post-socialism.

== Biography ==
Daphne Berdahl was born on June 14, 1964, in Freiburg, Germany, to Margaret and Robert Berdahl, a scholar of German History and well-known former chancellor of Berkeley. Berdahl was raised in Oregon, attended Oberlin College for her undergraduate degree, and earned her PhD at the University of Chicago. She received a two-year position as a post-doctoral fellow at Harvard, and later joined the faculty at the University of Minnesota, where she worked from 1997 to 2007 as an Assistant Professor and then an Associate Professor of Anthropology.

Berdahl married John N. Baldwin in 1990, and the couple had two daughters. On October 5, 2007, Berdahl died after an eight-year struggle with breast cancer. A graduate fellowship was set up at the University of Minnesota in her honor.

== Scholarship ==
Berdahl's research covered the topics of citizenship, nationalism, consumption, and the politics of memory, focusing on the former German Democratic Republic (East Germany). She was one of the first scholars to tackle Eastern Germany and post-socialism in the discipline of anthropology and one of the first scholars to grapple with the concept of Ostalgie, nostalgia for the east. She also focused on transglobal processes and local communities, national identity, and socialist societies' transitions, specifically German re-unification.

In 1999, she published Where the World Ended: Re-Unification and Identity in the German Borderland, an ethnographic account of her time spent in Kella, an East German border village between 1990 and 1992. She has also published a great deal on Ostalgie. In 2003, she received a McKnight Arts and Humanities Research Award, and in 2007, she was awarded a prestigious Guggenheim Fellowship.

A collection of her essays was published posthumously by Indiana University Press in 2010, "On the Social Life of Postsocialism: Memory, Consumption, Germany" by Daphne Berdahl, edited with an introduction by Matti Bunzl, foreword by Michael Herzfeld.

== Selected bibliography ==
- "Voices at the Wall: Discourses of Self, History and National Identity at the Vietnam Veterans Memorial," History & Memory: Studies in Representation of the Past 6 (Fall/Winter 1994), 88-124.
- Dismembering the Past: The Politics of Memory in the German Borderland (1997)
- Where the World Ended: Re-Unification and Identity in the German Borderland. Berkeley: University of California Press (1999), ISBN 978-0-520-21477-4.
- Ostalgie for the Present: Memory, Longing and East German Things (1999)
- Altering States: Ethnographies of Transition in Eastern Europe and the Former Soviet Union, University of Michigan Press (2000), ISBN 978-0-472-08617-7.
- Go, Trabi, Go! Reflections on a Car and its Symbolization Over Time (2001)
- On the Social Life of Postsocialism: Memory, Consumption, Germany (2009)

== Awards ==
- McKnight Foundation Arts and Humanities Research Award 2003
- Recipient of a Guggenheim Fellowship 2007
