= Dafna Lemish =

Israeli media researcher (born 1951)

- דפנה למיש
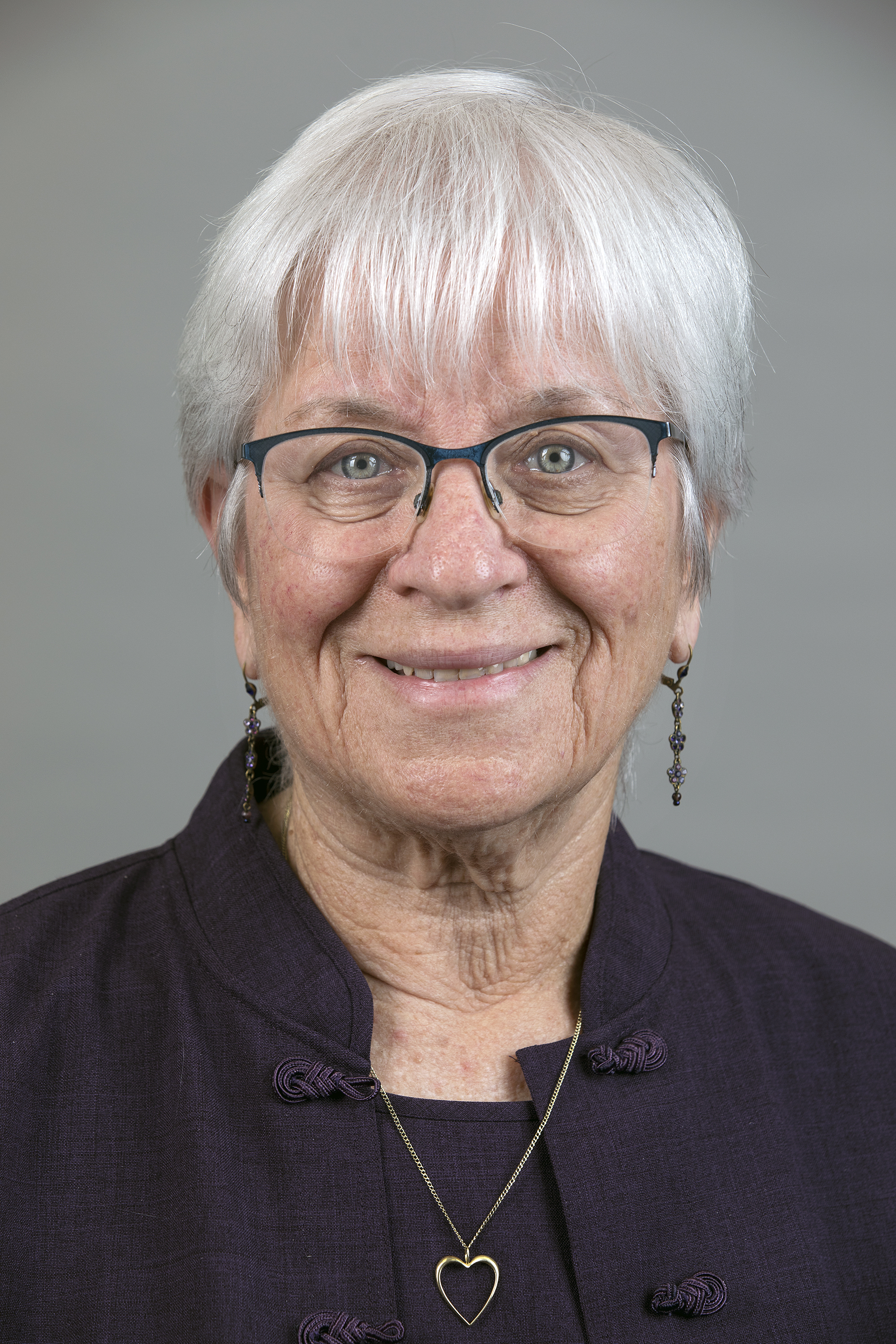
- Lemish in July 2022
- Born: September 26, 1951 (age 74); Haifa, Israel
- Education: Tel Aviv University (BA); Hebrew University of Jerusalem (MA); Ohio State University (PhD)
- Scientific career
- Fields: Media studies Social science
- Workplaces: Rutgers School of Communication and Information
- Thesis: Viewing television in public places : an ethnography (1982)

Dafna Lemish (Hebrew: דפנה למיש) is a media researcher and Interim Dean and Distinguished Professor of Journalism and Media Studies at Rutgers School of Communication and Information in New Brunswick, New Jersey. An International Communication Association (ICA) fellow, she is an author and editor of books, journal articles, book chapters, encyclopedia entries, reviews, and commentaries. Lemish is the founding editor of the Journal of Children and Media.

== Biography ==
Dafna Lemish was born and raised in Israel. She completed her BA degree in Geography at Tel Aviv University, her MA in Communication at the Hebrew University of Jerusalem, and her Ph.D. in Communication at Ohio State University. Upon return to Israel, she worked at Oranim College and later directed the Institute for the Research of Media and the Family, a non-profit organization later integrated within the Israeli Women's Network in Jerusalem. From 1990-1996, she was a founding member and a Senior Lecturer at The New School of Media Studies, Academic College of Management. In 1995, she moved to Tel Aviv University as part of the founding team of the Department of Communication, where she taught until 2010 and served as Chair for five years.

In 2010, while on sabbatical at the Center for Media and Child Health at Harvard University, she accepted a position as Chair of the Department of Radio, Television, and Digital Media at Southern Illinois University, later becoming the Dean of the College of Mass Communication and Media Arts. In 2016, she moved to New Jersey to serve as an Associate Dean for Programs at the School of Communication and Information at Rutgers University and was promoted to Distinguished Professor in 2019. She received the Rutgers Board of Trustees Award for Excellence in Research in 2020. In July 2022, Lemish assumed leadership of the Rutgers School of Communication and Information as interim dean until July 2025.

== Awards and recognitions ==
- The Charles Klotzer International Media Literacy Award, The Gateway Media Literacy Partners, 2015
- Inaugural recipient of the Senior Scholar Award of the Children, Media and Adolescents Division of the International Communication Association (ICA), 2012
- Fellow of the International Communication Association (ICA), 2010
- Inaugural recipient of the Teresa Award for the Advancement of Feminist Scholarship, The Feminist Scholarship Division of the International Communication Association (ICA), 2009

== Selected published works ==
- Götz, M. & Lemish, D. (Eds.) (2022). Children and media worldwide in a time of a pandemic. New York, NY: Peter Lang
- Lemish, D. (Ed.) (2022). The Routledge International Handbook of Children, Adolescents and Media (revised 2nd). New York and Abingdon: Routledge.
- Park, J. & Lemish, D. (2019). KakaoTalk and Facebook: Korean American youth constructing hybrid identities. New York, NY: Peter Lang.
- Götz, M., Lemish, D., Holler, A. (2019). Fear in front of the screen: Children’s fears, nightmares and thrills. New York, NY: Rowman & Littlefield.
- Lemish, D. & Götz, M. (Eds.) (2017). Beyond the stereotypes? Boys, girls, and their images. The International Clearinghouse of Children, Youth and Media, University of Gothenburg, Sweden: Nordicom.
- Lemish, D. (2015). Children and Media: A Global Perspective. Malden, MA: Wiley-Blackwell. Lemish, D. (Ed.). The Routledge International Handbook of Children, Adolescents and Media. New York and Abingdon: Routledge.
- Lemish, D. (Ed.) (2013). The Routledge international handbook of children, adolescents and media. New York and Abingdon: Routledge.
- Götz, M. & Lemish, D. (Eds.) (2012). Sexy girls, heroes and funny losers: Gender representations in children’s TV around the world. New York, NY: Peter Lang.
- Kolucki, B., Lemish, D. (2011). Communicating with Children: Principles and Practices to Nurture, Inspire, Excite, Educate and Heal. UNICEF.
- Lemish, D. (2010). Screening gender in children's TV: The views of producers around the world. New York and Abingdon: Routledge.
- Cohen, A.A., Lemish, D., & Schejter, A. (2008). The wonder phone in the land of miracles: Mobile telephony in Israel. Newark, NJ: Hampton Press.
- Lemish, D. & Götz, M. (Eds.) (2007). Children and media in times of war and conflict. Newark, NJ: Hampton Press.
- Lemish, D. (2006). Children and television: A Global perspective. Oxford, UK: Blackwell.
- Götz, M. Lemish, D. Aidman, A., & Moon, H. (2005). Media and the make-believe worlds of children: When Harry Potter meets Pokémon in Disneyland. New Jersey: Lawrence Erlbaum Associates.
