= Daphne Haldin =

Daphne Haldin (10 February 1899, Norwich – 1973, Hampstead) was a British art historian and honourable secretary of the Society of Jews and Christians.

Born on 10 February 1899 in Norwich to Alfred and Edith Haldinstein, she was one of seven children. Her father Alfred was a shoe manufacturer and merchant, and later became President of the Norwich Hebrew Congregation and chairman of the Norfolk Daily Standard Company Ltd, as well as receiving the honour of being made the Sheriff of Norwich. Daphne referred to herself using the more Anglicised, 'Haldin', both professionally and privately, and appears to be the only member of her family to do so, although it is not certain when she began doing this. After the death of her father, she moved with her mother to London, where she spent the rest of her life.

Despite evidence to suggest she studied History of Art at University College London and published at least one article on Medieval brasses for The Connoisseur, she remains otherwise unknown as an art historian. The only other known research she conducted was for a dictionary of female artists, the evidence of which can be found in a set of research notes, correspondence and planning documentation in an archive collection held at the Paul Mellon Centre.

== Dictionary of Women Artists ==
Haldin's main research project was a dictionary of European women artists born before 1850. She was attempting to redress the balance of scholarship on female artists by compiling a resource which captured a wide range of artist biographies. An example of the scale of Haldin's project is provided by the entries for artists under the letter 'B' which alone consists of 595 individual entries. The dictionary remained unpublished despite a large amount of research work being completed, and many efforts to generate interest. However, this work has been catalogued and made available as an archive at the Paul Mellon Centre library and archive.
