= List of fellows of the American Academy in Rome (1896–1970) =

List of fellows of the American Academy in Rome 1896 – 1970 records those American artists and scholars who have been awarded the Rome Prize from 1896 to 1970.

The Rome Prize is a prestigious American award made annually by the American Academy in Rome since 1896, through a national competition. The categories for the prize have changed since the earliest years of the academy to the present.

List of fellows of the American Academy in Rome
1896–1970	1971–1990	1991–2010	2011–present

== Fellows of the American Academy in Rome ==
Year	Category	Winner
1896	Classical studies & archaeology	William Kendall Denison
1897	Classical studies & archaeology	Walter Dennison
1897	Classical studies & archaeology	Albert F. Earnshow
1897	Classical studies & archaeology	Gordon Jennings Laing
1897	Architecture	John Russell Pope
1898	Classical studies & archaeology	William Warner Bishop
1898	Classical studies & archaeology	Clarence Linton Meader
1899	Visual arts	George William Breck
1899	Visual arts	Hermon Atkins MacNeil
1899	Classical studies & archaeology	George N. Olcott
1900	Classical studies & archaeology	George Dwight Kellogg
1900	Classical studies & archaeology	Walter Lowrie
1900	Classical studies & archaeology	Grant Showerman
1901	Classical studies & archaeology	Charles Upson Clark
1901	Classical studies & archaeology	Mabel Douglas Reid
1902	Classical studies & archaeology	George Henry Allen
1902	Visual arts	Andrew Thomas Schwartz
1903	Classical studies & archaeology	Henry Herbert Armstrong
1903	Classical studies & archaeology	Charles Rufus Morey
1904	Visual arts	Charles Keck
1906	Classical studies & archaeology	Susan Helen Ballou
1906	Classical studies & archaeology	Herbert Edward Everett
1906	Visual arts	Robert Knight Ryland
1906	Classical studies & archaeology	Albert William Van Buren
1907	Classical studies & archaeology	Philip J. Gentner
1907	Classical studies & archaeology	Austin Morris Harmon
1907	Classical studies & archaeology	Ralph Van Deman Magoffin
1908	Classical studies & archaeology	Clark D. Lamberton
1909	Visual arts	Paul Chalfin
1909	Visual arts	C. Percival Dietsch
1909	Classical studies & archaeology	Dean Putnam Lockwood
1909	Classical studies & archaeology	Thomas Jex Preston
1909	Classical studies & archaeology	Clara Louise Thompson
1909	Classical studies & archaeology	Esther Boise Van Deman
1909	Architecture	Harry Edward Warren
1910	Classical studies & archaeology	Guy Blandin Colburn
1910	Visual arts	Barry Faulkner
1910	Visual arts	Charles Harvey
1911	Visual arts	Frank Tolles Chamberlin
1911	Visual arts	Sherry Edmundson Fry
1911	Classical studies & archaeology	Dora Johnson
1911	Architecture	Ernest Farnum Lewis
1911	Classical studies & archaeology	Elias Avery Lowe
1911	Classical studies & archaeology	Anthony Pelzer Wagener
1911	Visual arts	Henry Lawrence Wolfe
1912	Classical studies & archaeology	Joseph Granger Brandt
1912	Classical studies & archaeology	George Harold Edgell
1912	Classical studies & archaeology	Frank Ray Elder
1912	Visual arts	Frank Perley Fairbanks
1912	Sculpture	Paul Manship
1912	Classical studies & archaeology	Arthur Harold Weston
1912	Architecture	Edgar Irving Williams
1913	Classical studies & archaeology	Richard Offner
1913	Visual arts	Albin Polasek
1913	Classical studies & archaeology	John Shapley
1913	Architecture	Richard Haviland Smythe
1913	Classical studies & archaeology	Margaret C. Waites
1913	Classical studies & archaeology	Philip Barrows Whitehead
1914	Classical studies & archaeology	John Raymond Crawford
1914	Architecture	George Simpson Koyl
1914	Visual arts	Berthold Nebel
1914	Visual arts	Ezra Winter
1915	Classical studies & archaeology	Charles Densmore Curtis
1915	Visual arts	John Clements Gregory
1915	Visual arts	Eugene Francis Savage
1915	Visual arts	Frederick Charles Stahr
1916	Visual arts	George Davidson
1916	Visual arts	Leo Friedlander
1916	Classical studies & archaeology	Raymond Davis Harriman
1916	Classical studies & archaeology	Eugene Stock McCartney
1916	Classical studies & archaeology	Horace Wetherill Wright
1917	Architecture	William J.H. Hough
1917	Classical studies & archaeology	John T. Reardon
1917	Visual arts	Harry I. Stickroth
1919	Architecture	Raymond McCormick Kennedy
1920	Visual arts	Russell Cowles
1920	Visual arts	Allyn Cox
1920	Visual arts	Joan W. Jennewein
1920	Visual arts	C. Paul Jennewein
1920	Visual arts	Joseph Emile Renier
1920	Architecture	Philip Trammell Shutze
1920	Classical studies & archaeology	Lily Ross Taylor
1920	Classical studies & archaeology	Gilbert Hawthorne Taylor
1921	Classical studies & archaeology	Ethel Leigh Chubb
1921	Classical studies & archaeology	Emily Wadsworth Cleland
1921	Landscape architecture	Edward Godfrey Lawson
1922	Classical studies & archaeology	Walter Reid Bryan
1922	Architecture	James Henry Chillmanl
1922	Visual arts	Thomas Hudson Jones
1922	Visual arts	Salvatore Lascari
1922	Classical studies & archaeology	William Stuart Messer
1923	Visual arts	Gaetano Cecere
1923	Visual arts	Carlo A. Ciampaglia
1923	Landscape architecture	Ralph E. Griswold
1923	Classical studies & archaeology	Louise A. Holland
1923	Classical studies & archaeology	Ernestine Franklin Leon
1923	Architecture	James Kellum Smith
1923	Architecture	Frederick J. Woodbridge
1924	Visual arts	Edmond Romulus Amateis
1924	Musical composition	Howard Harold Hanson
1924	Classical studies & archaeology	Homer Franklin Rebert
1924	Classical studies & archaeology	Robert Samuel Rogers
1924	Classical studies & archaeology	Ruskin R. Rosborough
1924	Visual arts	Frank Henry Schwarz
1924	Musical composition	Leo Sowerby
1925	Classical studies & archaeology	Marion Elizabeth Blake
1925	Visual arts	Alfred Ernst Floegel
1925	Architecture	Henri Gabriel Marceau
1925	Visual arts	Lawrence Tenney Stevens
1925	Musical composition	Randall Thompson
1925	Musical composition	Wintter Watts
1926	Architecture	Arthur Francis Deam
1926	Classical studies & archaeology	Lillian Beatrice Lawler
1926	Visual arts	Alvin Meyer
1926	Landscape architecture	Norman T Newton
1926	Classical studies & archaeology	Charles Alexander Robinson
1926	Classical studies & archaeology	Inez Gertrude Scott Ryberg
1927	Visual arts	Francis Scott Bradford
1927	Visual arts	Harry Poole Camden
1927	Classical studies & archaeology	John Day
1927	Musical composition	George Herbert Elwell
1927	Classical studies & archaeology	F. L. Santee
1927	Classical studies & archaeology	Lillian Starr
1928	Architecture	William Douglas
1928	Visual arts	Augustus Clemens Finley
1928	Architecture	George Fraser
1928	Classical studies & archaeology	Mildred McConnell Gardner
1928	Visual arts	Walker K. Hancock
1928	Musical composition	Walter Helfer
1928	Visual arts	Michael Joseph Mueller
1928	Architecture	Stuart Maclaren Shaw
1929	Architecture	Clarence Dale Badgeley
1929	Classical studies & archaeology	Howard Comfort
1929	Visual arts	Deane Keller
1929	Visual arts	Joseph Kiselewski
1929	Musical composition	Robert Levine Sanders
1929	Landscape architecture	Richard K. Webel
1930	Visual arts	Dunbar Dyson Beck
1930	Classical studies & archaeology	Raymond Theodore Ohl
1930	Classical studies & archaeology	James Henry Oliver
1930	Architecture	Homer Fay Pfeiffer
1930	Classical studies & archaeology	Collice Henry Portnoff
1930	Landscape architecture	Michael Rapuano
1930	Classical studies & archaeology	Irene A. Rosenzweig
1930	Visual arts	George Holburn Snowden
1930	Musical composition	Alexander Lang Steinert
1931	Architecture	Cecil C. Briggs
1931	Classical studies & archaeology	Franklin Weeks Jones
1931	Visual arts	Donald Magnus Mattison
1931	Classical studies & archaeology	George McCracken
1931	Visual arts	David Rubins
1931	Musical composition	Roger Sessions
1931	Classical studies & archaeology	Edmund Taite Silk
1932	Classical studies & archaeology	Henry Ess Askew
1932	Classical studies & archaeology	Elizabeth Cornelia Evans
1932	Architecture	Burton Kenneth Johnstone
1932	Classical studies & archaeology	Adele Jeanne Kibre
1932	Musical composition	Normand Lockwood
1932	Landscape architecture	Thomas D. Price
1932	Visual arts	John M. Sitton
1932	Landscape architecture	Charles R. Sutton
1932	Visual arts	Sidney Biehler Waugh
1933	Classical studies & archaeology	Frank Edward Brown
1933	Visual arts	Salvatore De Maio
1933	Classical studies & archaeology	Alfred Gelstharp
1933	Musical composition	Werner Janssen
1933	Classical studies & archaeology	Agnes Kirsopp Michels
1933	Architecture	Henry D. Mirick
1933	Landscape architecture	Richard C. Murdock
1933	Landscape architecture	Neil H. Park
1933	Architecture	Walter L. Reichardt
1933	Visual arts	William Marks Simpson
1934	Visual arts	Harry Gregory Ackerman
1934	Landscape architecture	Henri E. Chabanne
1934	Classical studies & archaeology	Chester Carr Greene
1934	Musical composition	Herbert Reynolds Inch
1934	Visual arts	Warren Towle Mosman
1934	Classical studies & archaeology	Bernard Mann Peebles
1934	Classical studies & archaeology	Dorothy M. Schullian
1935	Visual arts	Robert F.P. Amendola
1935	Classical studies & archaeology	Aline Abaecherli Boyce
1935	Classical studies & archaeology	George K. Boyce
1935	Visual arts	Daniel Boza
1935	Musical composition	Hunter Johnson
1935	Classical studies & archaeology	Richmond Alexander Lattimore
1935	Visual arts	James Owen Mahoney
1935	Visual arts	Robert J. McKnight
1935	Visual arts	Gifford Proctor
1935	Classical studies & archaeology	Meyer Reinholdr
1935	Landscape architecture	Morris E. Trotter
1936	Visual arts	Gilbert Banever
1936	Musical composition	Vittorio Giannini
1936	Architecture	Olindo Grossi
1936	Landscape architecture	Alden Hopkins
1936	Visual arts	Reuben R. Kramer
1936	Classical studies & archaeology	Naphtali Lewis
1936	Classical studies & archaeology	George Joseph Siefert
1936	Architecture	Robert A. Weppner
1937	Musical composition	Samuel Barber
1937	Architecture	George T. Licht
1937	Landscape architecture	James M. Lister
1937	Classical studies & archaeology	Francis Redding Walton
1938	Architecture	Richard W. Ayers
1938	Classical studies & archaeology	Claude W. Barlow
1938	Visual arts	Harrison Gibbs
1938	Visual arts	Robert Berkeley Green
1938	Landscape architecture	Robert S. Kitchen
1938	Classical studies & archaeology	Susan May Savage
1938	Classical studies & archaeology	Walter F. Snyder
1938	Classical studies & archaeology	William Richard Tongue
1939	Classical studies & archaeology	William T. Avery
1939	Visual arts	Matthew W. Boyhan
1939	Architecture	Richard Gardner Hartshorne
1939	Classical studies & archaeology	Lester Clarence Houck
1939	Visual arts	Clifford Edgar Jones
1939	Musical composition	Kent W. Kennan
1939	Landscape architecture	John F. Kirkpatrick
1939	Classical studies & archaeology	Erling C. Olsen
1939	Musical composition	Frederich Woltmann
1940	Visual arts	John Amore
1940	Classical studies & archaeology	Frances G. Blank
1940	Classical studies & archaeology	Miriam Friedman Drabkin
1940	Architecture	Violet H. Iversen
1940	Architecture	Erling F. Iverson
1940	Landscape architecture	Stuart M. Mertz
1940	Musical composition	Charles Naginski
1940	Classical studies & archaeology	Chester G. Starr
1941	Visual arts	Harry A. Davis
1941	Musical composition	William Douglas Denny
1941	Visual arts	George Matthew Koren
1942	Visual arts	Loren Russell Fisher
1942	Musical composition	Arthur Kreutz
1942	Classical studies & archaeology	Herbert S. Long
1942	Visual arts	Robert Pippenger
1942	Classical studies & archaeology	Carl R. Trahman
1947	Musical composition	Samuel Barber
1947	Architecture	George Howe
1947	History of art	Henry McIlhenny
1947	Musical composition	Douglas Stuart Moore
1948	Architecture	Walker O. Cain
1948	Architecture	Frederic S. Coolidge
1948	Classical studies & archaeology	John Sylvester Creaghan
1948	Landscape architecture	Charles A. Currier
1948	Landscape architecture	F. W. Edmondson
1948	Classical studies & archaeology	Charlotte Elizabeth
1948	Visual arts	Charles A. Owens
1948	Visual arts	William Thon
1948	Classical studies & archaeology	William Richard Tongue
1948	Architecture	Charles D. Wiley
1948	Classical studies & archaeology	Lois V. Williams
1949	Classical studies & archaeology	Bertram Berman
1949	Classical studies & archaeology	Doris Taylor Bishop
1949	Visual arts	Gilbert A. Franklin
1949	Classical studies & archaeology	Arthur E. Gordon
1949	Visual arts	John Gulias
1949	Visual arts	Philip Guston
1949	Musical composition	Alexei Haieff
1949	Classical studies & archaeology	Robert E. Hecht
1949	Visual arts	John E. Heliker
1949	Musical composition	Andrew W. Imbrie
1949	History of art	Patrick Joseph Kelleher
1949	Architecture	James R. Lamantia
1949	Visual arts	Robert J. McCloskey
1949	History of art	Richard B.K. McLanathan
1949	Classical studies & archaeology	Dorothy M. Robathan
1949	Classical studies & archaeology	Doris M. Taylor
1949	Visual arts	Albert Wein
1950	Musical composition	Jack Hamilton Beeson
1950	Classical studies & archaeology	S. Palmer Bovie
1950	Landscape architecture	Vincent C. Cerasi
1950	Architecture	George Howe
1950	Architecture	David L. Leavitt
1950	Classical studies & archaeology	Paul MacKendrick
1950	Classical studies & archaeology	Clarence Whittlesley Mendell
1950	Classical studies & archaeology	Lucy Shoe Meritt
1950	History of art	Agnes Mongan
1950	Visual arts	Henry Varnum Poor
1950	Classical studies & archaeology	Lawrence Richardson, Jr.
1950	Visual arts	Concetta Maria Scaravaglione
1950	Visual arts	Mitchell Siporin
1950	Classical studies & archaeology	Myra L. Uhlfelder
1950	Landscape architecture	Brooks E. Wigginton
1950	History of art	Edgar Wind
1951	Visual arts	Peter Paul Abate
1951	Classical studies & archaeology	Freeman W. Adams
1951	Classical studies & archaeology	Otto J. Brendel
1951	Architecture	Dale Claude Byrd
1951	Musical composition	Aaron Copland
1951	Architecture	Spero Daltas
1951	Classical studies & archaeology	Harry Mortimer Hubbell
1951	Architecture	Henri V. Jova
1951	Architecture	Louis I. Kahn
1951	Visual arts	Herbert L. Kammerer
1951	Classical studies & archaeology	Berthe M. Marti
1951	Classical studies & archaeology	William T. McKibben
1951	History of art	Margaret Koons Miller
1951	History of art	William B. Miller
1951	History of art	Agnes Mongan
1951	Landscape architecture	George E. Patton
1951	Visual arts	Bernard Perlin
1951	Visual arts	Henry Varnum Poor
1951	Musical composition	George A. Rochberg
1951	Musical composition	Harold S. Shapero
1952	History of art	James S. Ackerman
1952	Architecture	Joseph Amisano
1952	Visual arts	George Biddle
1952	Architecture	Thomas L. Dawson
1952	Visual arts	Seymour Drumlevitch
1952	Classical studies & archaeology	Joseph Fontenrose
1952	Musical composition	Lukas Foss
1952	Visual arts	EvAngelos William Frudakis
1952	Classical studies & archaeology	Mason Hammond
1952	Landscape architecture	Dale H. Hawkins
1952	Literature	Anthony Hecht
1952	Musical composition	Ulysses Kay
1952	Musical composition	Gail T. Kubik
1952	Visual arts	Joseph L. Lasker
1952	Architecture	Tallie B. Maule
1952	Classical studies & archaeology	Paul Pascal
1952	Classical studies & archaeology	Emeline Richardsonh
1952	Musical composition	Randall Thompson
1952	Classical studies & archaeology	Helen Elizabeth Russell White
1953	Architecture	Richard E. Baringer
1953	Landscape architecture	Richard C. Bell
1953	Classical studies & archaeology	Donald F. Brown
1953	Classical studies & archaeology	Wendell Clausen
1953	Classical studies & archaeology	Robert F. Goheen
1953	Musical composition	Alexei Haieff
1953	Visual arts	James A. Hanes
1953	Classical studies & archaeology	Martha W. Hoffman
1953	Architecture	Jean Labatut
1953	Classical studies & archaeology	Martha Hoffman Lewis
1953	Classical studies & archaeology	Elaine P. Loeffler
1953	Architecture	Stanley H. Pansky
1953	Visual arts	Norman J. Rubington
1953	Classical studies & archaeology	William G. Sinnigen
1953	Literature	William Styron
1953	Visual arts	Elbert Weinberg
1953	Classical studies & archaeology	Philip F. Wooby
1954	Classical studies & archaeology	Mary Taylor Babcock
1954	Landscape architecture	Edward Bruce Baetjer
1954	Architecture	Pietro Belluschi
1954	Classical studies & archaeology	Frank Edward Brown
1954	Musical composition	Elliott Carter
1954	History of art	Hereward Lester Cooke
1954	Literature	Sigrid De Lima
1954	Classical studies & archaeology	Kenneth Falk
1954	Visual arts	Stephen Greene
1954	Architecture	John H. MacFadyen
1954	Classical studies & archaeology	Charles Theophilus Murphy
1954	Architecture	Robert Myers
1954	Musical composition	Nikolai Nabokov
1954	Design	Donald Mitchell Oenslager
1954	Visual arts	Arthur Osver
1954	Visual arts	John W. Rhoden
1954	Literature	Allen Tate
1954	Musical composition	Frank Wigglesworth
1955	Classical studies & archaeology	William S. Anderson
1955	Classical studies & archaeology	Charles L. Babcock
1955	Classical studies & archaeology	Frank Edward Brown
1955	Classical studies & archaeology	Katherine A. Geffcken
1955	Visual arts	Alan Gussow
1955	Classical studies & archaeology	Martha Leeb Hadzi
1955	Classical studies & archaeology	John Arthur Hanson
1955	Visual arts	Walter Kelly Hood
1955	Visual arts	Robert Laurent
1955	Visual arts	Ira C. Matteson
1955	Musical composition	Robert W. Moevs
1955	Architecture	Warren A. Peterson
1955	Architecture	Warren Platner
1955	Visual arts	Steve Raffo
1955	Visual arts	Robert W. White
1955	Literature	Richard Wilbur
1956	Classical studies & archaeology	James I. Armstrong
1956	Literature	Van Wyck Brooks
1956	Architecture	James A. Gresham
1956	Classical studies & archaeology	Richard E. Grimm
1956	Visual arts	James Joseph Hoffman
1956	History of art	Richard Krautheimer
1956	Classical studies & archaeology	Brooks Emmons Levy
1956	Classical studies & archaeology	William L. MacDonald
1956	Musical composition	Goffredo Petrassi
1956	Classical studies & archaeology	Edmund Taite Silk
1956	Visual arts	William Thon
1956	Architecture	Robert Venturi
1956	Musical composition	Yehudi Wyner
1957	Classical studies & archaeology	William Arrowsmith
1957	Classical studies & archaeology	Eric C. Baade
1957	Visual arts	Alfred H. Blaustein
1957	Classical studies & archaeology	Herbert Bloch
1957	Visual arts	Peter Blume
1957	Landscape architecture	Stephen F. Bochkor
1957	Architecture	Charles G. Brickbauer
1957	Literature	John Ciardi
1957	Visual arts	Thomas H. Dahill
1957	Literature	Ralph Ellison
1957	History of art	Joachim E. Gaehde
1957	Visual arts	Walter H. Hahn
1957	Visual arts	Walker K. Hancock
1957	History of art	Philip Hofer
1957	Musical composition	Billy Jim Layton
1957	Literature	Archibald Macleish
1957	Musical composition	Bohuslav Martinu
1957	Classical studies & archaeology	Norman Neuerburg
1957	Architecture	Dan Robert Stewart
1957	Literature	Robert Penn Warren
1957	Musical composition	Richard M. Willis
1957	Visual arts	James N. Wines
1958	Architecture	Francis F.A. Comstock
1958	Literature	Malcolm Cowley
1958	Literature	Robert Francis
1958	Visual arts	Leon Goldin
1958	History of art	Howard Hibbard
1958	Classical studies & archaeology	Herbert Hoffmann
1958	Musical composition	Stanley Hollingsworth
1958	Architecture	David J. Jacob
1958	Visual arts	Paul J. Kirchmer
1958	Musical composition	Otto Luening
1958	Classical studies & archaeology	Paul MacKendrick
1958	Classical studies & archaeology	Ann Freeman Meyvaert
1958	Visual arts	Arthur Osver
1958	Literature	Louis Simpson
1958	Musical composition	William O. Smith
1958	Landscape architecture	Erik A. Svenson
1958	Visual arts	Jack Zajac
1959	Literature	Robert Ely Bagg
1959	Visual arts	Eugene Berman
1959	Landscape architecture	Robert T. Buchanan
1959	Classical studies & archaeology	Anne P. Burnett
1959	Literature	George Palmer Garrett
1959	Classical studies and archaeology	Harold Gotoff
1959	Visual arts	Milton Elting Hebald
1959	Classical studies & archaeology	Michael H. Jameson
1959	Architecture	James R. Jarrett
1959	Visual arts	Zubel Kachadoorian
1959	Architecture	Jean Labatut
1959	Classical studies and archaeology	John O. Lenaghan
1959	Classical studies and archaeology	Lydia Lenaghan
1959	Musical composition	Salvatore Martirano
1959	Classical studies and archaeology	Chester F. Natunewicz
1959	Architecture	Nathaniel Alexander Owings
1960	Visual arts	Donald Aquilino
1960	Literature	Elizabeth Bowen
1960	Classical studies & archaeology	T. Robert S. Broughton
1960	Landscape architecture	Thomas Dolliver Church
1960	Architecture	Francis F.A. Comstock
1960	Classical studies & archaeology	Mario A. Del Chiaro
1960	Architecture	Ronald L. Dirsmith
1960	Musical composition	Ross Lee Finney
1960	Classical studies & archaeology	Bettie L. Forte
1960	Musical composition	Higo H. Harada
1960	Classical studies & archaeology	Louise A. Holland
1960	History of art	Horst Woldemar Janson
1960	Literature	Matthew Josephson
1960	Literature	Edmund Keeley
1960	Visual arts	Rico Lebrun
1960	Visual arts	Eugene E. Matthews
1960	History of art	Henry A. Millon
1960	History of art	Craig Hugh Smyth
1960	Literature	Wallace Stegner
1960	Architecture	Edward Durell Stone
1960	Architecture	John J. Stonehill
1960	Classical Studies & archaeology	John W. Zarker
1961	Architecture	Max Abramovitz
1961	Visual arts	Lennart Anderson
1961	Visual arts	John A. Annus
1961	Landscape architecture	Eric Armstrong
1961	Visual arts	Wayne Begley
1961	Visual arts	Louis Bouche
1961	Classical studies & archaeology	Dericksen M. Brinkerhoff
1961	Literature	Harold Brodkey
1961	History of art	Eugene A. Carroll
1961	Visual arts	Aldo J. Casanova
1961	Visual arts	Gardner Cox
1961	Classical studies & archaeology	Alfred Frazer
1961	Visual arts	Pritchett Allen Harris
1961	History of art	Ruth Wedgewood Kennedy
1961	History of art	Clarence Kennedy
1961	Classical studies & archaeology	Anne Laidlaw
1961	History of art	Milton Joseph Lewine
1961	Visual arts	John L. Massey
1961	Musical composition	Robert W. Moevs
1961	Architecture	Theodore J. Musho
1961	History of art	Donald Posner
1961	Classical studies & archaeology	Michael Wigodsky
1961	Musical composition	G. B. Wilson
1961	Landscape architecture	Ervin H. Zube
1962	Visual arts	Ronald C. Binks
1962	Classical studies & archaeology	Richard Brilliant
1962	Literature	Walter Clemons
1962	Architecture	Royston T. Daley
1962	Musical composition	John C. Eaton
1962	Architecture	Michael Graves
1962	Visual arts	Adlai S. Hardin
1962	Classical studies & archaeology	R. Ross Holloway
1962	Musical composition	John La Montaine
1962	Architecture	Roy Frank Larson
1962	Classical studies & archaeology	Berthe M. Marti
1962	Landscape architecture	Don H. Olson
1962	Visual arts	Anthony Padovano
1962	Architecture	Wayne Taylor
1962	Classical studies & archaeology	Charles Witke
1963	Visual arts	Mark Adams
1963	Musical composition	Leslie R. Bassett
1963	Visual arts	James D. Brooks
1963	Musical composition	Elliott Carter
1963	Classical studies & archaeology	James J.M. Curry
1963	History of art	Horst de la Croix
1963	Literature	Alan Dugan
1963	Visual arts	Lawrence S. Fane
1963	Architecture	Robert M. Golder
1963	Visual arts	Walker K. Hancock
1963	Architecture	James M. Hunter
1963	Visual arts	Robert J. Jergens
1963	Visual arts	Marjorie E. Kreilick-McNab
1963	Musical composition	Paul Nelson
1963	Post-classical humanistic studies	Emil J. Polak
1963	Post-classical humanistic studies	Kenneth J. Pratt
1963	Classical studies & archaeology	Charles P. Segal
1963	Classical studies & archaeology	Erik Sjoqvist
1963	Literature	George Starbuck
1963	Architecture	Bernard Norman Steinberg
1963	Architecture	Charles Stifter
1963	Landscape architecture	Richard K. Webel
1963	Architecture	Astra Zarina
1964	Visual arts	A. Robert Birmelin
1964	Classical studies & archaeology	Michael Chelik
1964	Post-classical humanistic studies	Frank A. D'Accone
1964	Visual arts	Richard Howard Ellis
1964	Classical studies & archaeology	Richard I. Frank
1964	Visual arts	James J. Hennessey
1964	Musical composition	Ezra Laderman
1964	Architecture	Thomas N. Larson
1964	Musical composition	Marvin D. Levy
1964	Classical studies & archaeology	Maria Teresa Marabini Moevs
1964	Landscape architecture	Roger B. Martin
1964	History of art	Charles I. Minott
1964	Classical studies & archaeology	James E. Packer
1964	Classical studies & archaeology	Michael C.J. Putnam
1964	Classical studies & archaeology	Philip Hamilton Rhinelander
1964	Visual arts	Ron J. Schwerin
1964	Classical studies & archaeology	Edward W. Spofford
1964	Classical studies & archaeology	Arthur Steinberg
1964	Architecture	Duane Thorbeck
1964	Visual arts	Stephen G. Werlick
1965	History of art	James S. Ackerman
1965	Post-classical humanistic studies	Robert A. Blazis
1965	History of art	Charles G. Dempsey
1965	Classical studies & archaeology	Susan B. Downey
1965	Post-classical humanistic studies	Linda Fowler-Magerl
1965	Post-classical humanistic studies	Frank D. Gilliard
1965	Visual arts	Philip Grausman
1965	History of art	Bartlett H. Hayes
1965	Visual arts	Jack Henderson
1965	Architecture	Jean Labatut
1965	Musical composition	Otto Luening
1965	Visual arts	Ezio Martinelli
1965	History of art	Henry A. Millon
1965	Post-classical humanistic studies	John W. O'Malley
1965	Visual arts	William Ouellette
1965	Visual arts	Roger Ricco
1965	Architecture	Milo H. Thompson
1965	Visual arts	William Thon
1966	Musical composition	Jack Hamilton Beeson
1966	Visual arts	Seymour Drumlevitch
1966	Visual arts	Gilbert A. Franklin
1966	Musical composition	Vincent S. Frohne
1966	History of art	Sigfried Giedion
1966	Post-classical humanistic studies	Frederick Hammond
1966	Classical studies & archaeology	Ursula M. Heibges
1966	Landscape architecture	Dean A. Johnson
1966	History of art	Douglas Lewis
1966	Architecture	Theodore Liebman
1966	Classical studies & archaeology	Anna Marguerite McCann
1966	History of art	Charles Mitchell
1966	Architecture	Robert Mittelstadt
1966	Architecture	William Pedersen
1966	Architecture	Charles O. Perry
1966	Visual arts	Henry C. Rollins
1966	Classical studies & archaeology	David O. Ross
1966	Visual arts	Raymond Saunders
1966	Landscape architecture	Terry Schnadelbach
1966	Classical studies & archaeology	Russell T. Scott
1966	Visual arts	Harold Tovish
1966	Architecture	Aldo en H. Van Eyck
1966	Visual arts	Charles A. Wells
1966	Musical composition	Charles Whittenberg
1967	Musical composition	Stephen J. Albert
1967	Classical studies & archaeology	Hubert L. Allen
1967	Architecture	Edward Larrabee Barnes
1967	Visual arts	Varujan Boghosian
1967	Post-classical humanistic studies	Paul M. Clogan
1967	Visual arts	Peter B. Devries
1967	Landscape architecture	Jon S. Emerson
1967	History of art	Philipp Fehl
1967	Visual arts	Gregory Gillespie
1967	Landscape architecture	Norman T. Newton
1967	Classical studies & archaeology	Thalia A. Pandiri
1967	Visual arts	John Nick Pappas
1967	Visual arts	W. J. Patterson
1967	Classical studies & archaeology	Henry Rowell
1967	Classical studies & archaeology	Ann Reynolds Scott
1967	Visual arts	Susan Vanderbilt Smyly
1967	History of art	Richard Stapleford
1967	Visual arts	Gilbert Leonard Stone
1967	Musical composition	Richard Aaker Trythall
1967	Architecture	Austris J. Vitols
1967	Musical composition	Hugo Weisgall
1967	Musical composition	Philip Winsor
1968	Design	Gerald D. Adams
1968	History of art	Henry C. Boren
1968	Classical studies & archaeology	Virginia Brown
1968	Musical composition	Morris Moshe Cotel
1968	Architecture	Thomas V. Czarnowski
1968	Musical composition	Jack Fortner
1968	Classical studies & archaeology	Bruce W. Frier
1968	Visual arts	Alexander Hunenko
1968	Musical composition	Andrew W. Imbrie
1968	Landscape architecture	Frank D. James
1968	Visual arts	Richard A. Johnson
1968	History of art	Richard Krautheimer
1968	Visual arts	Julian Edwin Levi
1968	History of art	Loren W. Partridge
1968	Architecture	William Reed
1968	Visual arts	Karen Saler
1968	Landscape architecture	Seth H. Seablom
1968	Design	William V. Shaw
1968	Visual arts	Paul R. Suttman
1968	Classical studies & archaeology	John H. Wright
1969	Architecture	Nelson Aldrich
1969	History of art	Glenn M. Andres
1969	Classical studies & archaeology	Helen Bacon
1969	Architecture	Jacob Berend Bakema
1969	Classical studies & archaeology	Jacquelyn C. Clinton
1969	Visual arts	Linda Dauw Dries
1969	Classical studies & archaeology	Mary-Kay Gamel
1969	Literature	Anthony Hecht
1969	Musical composition	John Heineman
1969	Classical studies & archaeology	George W. Houston
1969	Post-classical humanistic studies	Julius Kirshner
1969	Architecture	Louis A. McMillen
1969	Classical studies and archaeology	Floyd Moreland
1969	Landscape architecture	Paul R. V. Pawlowski
1969	History of art	Donald Posner
1969	Architecture	Thomas L. Schumacher
1969	Architecture	Peter F. Smith
1969	Visual arts	Michael C. Spafford
1969	Architecture	Paul Thiry
1969	Visual arts	Robert W. White
1969	Visual arts	Christopher John Wray
1970	History of art	James S. Ackerman
1970	Architecture	Edward Charles Bassett
1970	Classical studies & archaeology	Malcolm Bell
1970	Visual arts	John Patrick Civitello
1970	Visual arts	Lewis Cohen
1970	Visual arts	Edward E. Dron
1970	Architecture	Ronald C. Filson
1970	Architecture	John D. Heimbaugh
1970	Literature	John Hersey
1970	Classical studies & archaeology	R. Ross Holloway
1970	Visual arts	Jerry B. Kearns
1970	Post-classical humanistic studies	Richard Kenworthy
1970	Design	J. Michael Kirkland
1970	Landscape architecture	Albert R. Lamb
1970	Visual arts	John C. Leavey
1970	Literature	Jeanne R. Lowe
1970	Design	R. Alan Melting
1970	History of art	Alfred Kummer Moir
1970	Classical studies & archaeology	Michael C.J. Putnam
1970	Post-classical humanistic studies	Eyvind C. Ronquist
1970	Architecture	Colin Rowe
1970	Architecture	J. Michael Schwarting
1970	Architecture	Daniel V. Scully
1970	Visual arts	Sidney Simon
1970	History of art	Patricia A. Waddy
1970	Musical composition	Henry Weinberg
1970	Musical composition	Louis Weingarden
1970	Musical composition	Frank Wigglesworth
1970	Visual arts	Kenneth R. Worley
