= Agnes Mongan =

American art historian (1905–1996)

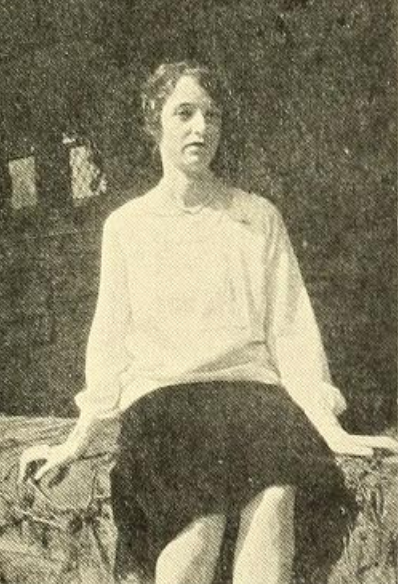
- Agnes Mongan, from the 1927 yearbook of Bryn Mawr College
- Born: Agnes Mongan; January 21, 1905; Somerville, Massachusetts, United States
- Died: September 15, 1996 (aged 91); Cambridge, Massachusetts, United States
- Education: Bryn Mawr College; Smith College
- Parent(s): Charles Edward Mongan; Elizabeth Teresa O'Brien
- Relatives: Charles (born 1903); John (born 1907); Elizabeth (born 1909)

Agnes Mongan (January 21, 1905 – September 15, 1996) was an American art historian, who served as a curator and director for the Harvard Art Museums.

== Career ==
Mongan received her B.A. in 1927 from Bryn Mawr College with a degree art history and English literature. She subsequently attended Smith College, where she studied Italian art and received her A.M. in 1929. Following a short internship at the Fogg Art Museum in 1928, she was hired as a research assistant for associate director Paul J. Sachs, where she remained until 1937. From 1937 to 1947, she was promoted to new a position titled "Keeper of Drawings," since women were not allowed to be named curators. In 1947, she became Curator of Drawings following the acceptance of women as curators, a position she held until her retirement in 1975. Along with Adelyn Dohme Breeskin from Baltimore Museum of Art, she was one of the first female curators at a major art museum in the United States. From 1951 to 1964, she also held the position of assistant director, from 1964 to 1968 associate director, and from 1968 to 1969 acting director, and from 1969 to 1971 Director. In addition to lecturing at Harvard University, she also taught courses at the University of Texas at Austin. She also became acting director of the Timken Museum of Art in San Diego, California, for a period. In 1953, she received an honorary degree from Wheaton College. In 1972, Alexander Calder drew her caricature, which is now part of the Fogg collection. She was honored by the Harvard Art Museums in 1994 when the Agnes Mongan Center for the Study of Prints, Drawings, and Photographs opened at the Fogg, which was designed by Samuel Anderson Architects. After her retirement in 1975, she remained as an emeritus curator for the Fogg and continued to produce exhibitions and related catalogues.

== Works ==
- Harvard Honors Lafayette, 1975, ISBN 0674193202
- David to Corot: French Drawings in the Fogg Art Museum, 1996, ISBN 0674193202

== Honors ==
- Fellow of the American Academy in Rome (2): 1950–51
- Fellow of the American Academy of Arts and Sciences: 1953
- Women's Caucus for Art Lifetime Achievement Award: 1987
