= Andrew Schwartz =

Andrew Schwartz may refer to:

- H. Andrew Schwartz (1968–2025), American journalist and chief communications officer
- Andrew Thomas Schwartz (1867–1942), American painter
- Andy Schwartz (born 1950), American politician, member of the Wyoming House of Representatives
