= Arthur Osver =

American painter (1912–2006)

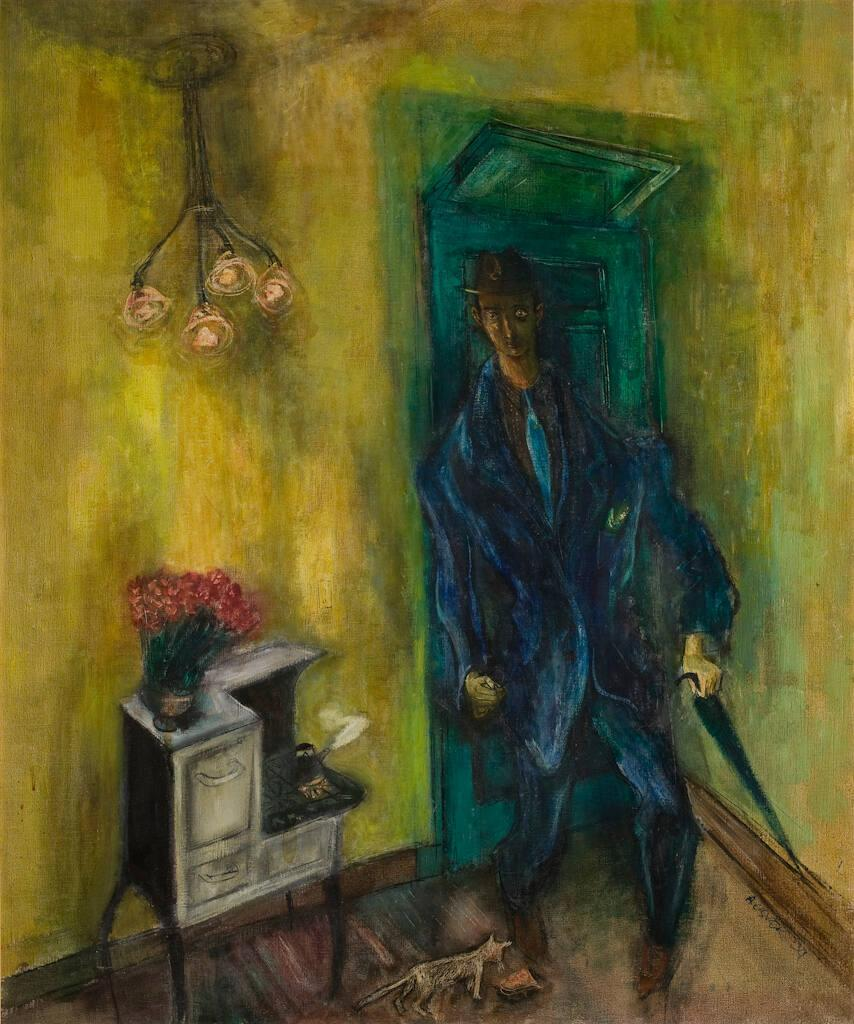
- "Interior" (1939) - Oil painting by Arthur Osver
- Born: July 25, 1912; Chicago, Illinois, U.S.
- Died: July 24, 2006 (aged 93); St. Louis, Missouri, U.S.
- Occupation: Painter
- Spouse: Ernestine Betsberg (m. 1937)

Arthur Osver (July 25, 1912 – July 24, 2006) was an American painter from Chicago, Illinois. He was known for his urban landscapes, as well as his later turn towards abstraction and mixed media. Many of his notable paintings feature rooftops, rooftop ventilators, and chimneys as subjects, and employ forced perspective.

== Early life ==
Arthur Osver was born in Chicago to Herschel and Yetta Osver, immigrants from Russia. In 1930, he enrolled in the Medill School of Journalism at Northwestern University. After one year, he transferred to the School of the Art Institute of Chicago, where he trained under Boris Anisfeld. At the Art Institute in 1934, he met fellow painter Ernestine Betsberg, whom he would later marry in 1937.

== Career ==
=== Early work and urban landscapes ===
After graduating from the Art Institute, Osver was support as an artist in the Illinois Art Project, the state branch of the Federal Art Project, a New Deal program under the Works Progress Administration.

In 1940, Osver and Betsberg moved to Greenwich Village, and then later to Long Island City, where they lived for eight years. Osver described his time in Long Island City as "...the most productive years of my life." In New York, Osver began to find success in the art world. In 1942, the Museum of Modern Art purchased his work "Melancholy of a Rooftop" after he solicited them to view his paintings. He presented a one-man exhibition, which included his painting Majestic Tenement, at the Grand Central Galleries in 1947. His exhibition received favorable response in Art News. Hired by the Art School of the Brooklyn Museum of Art in the same year, he taught students including Lorenzo Homar.

=== Time in Rome and turn to abstraction ===
After winning the Rome Prize in 1952, Osver worked in Italy until 1955. The break from familiar forms of American industrial structures lead to a development of abstraction in his work. Many of his paintings began to lose the recognizable forms that had come to define his work, and instead used pastel colors to mark the impression that sunlight on foreign forms left in him. He would later paint with compromise between structure and abstraction; The Tall Red (1959) has been described as "a temporary armistice between landscape and pure abstraction."

=== Return to the US ===
Osver returned to New York in 1955 and taught at Cooper Union. In 1960, Osver was hired to teach at the Washington University in St. Louis after encouragement from Philip Guston and Kenneth Eugene Hudson to accept the position.

In his late career, he began experimenting with new painting media. In April 1959, he presented his first showing of water color paintings at the Philadelphia Art Alliance. He also experimented with latex house paints and acrylic enamels.

=== Style ===
Osver's work has been variously described as cubist, geometric abstraction, and associated with New Objectivity and Magical Realism. His early work has been contrasted to the more sharp and pristine industrial subjects of the earlier precisionists like Charles Demuth and Charles Sheeler, while drawing comparisons to the surrealist works of Giorgio de Chirico.

Osver described his industrial subjects in naturalistic terms, stating of his painting "Nocturne":

Yes, my painting derives from nature. It is no accident that I live in a large city--the things I paint are found there. The ability to deal directly with my subject results in an ever-growing awareness of its possibilities. And that's the big thing. For I feel very strongly that it is only through such a living, energetic contact with nature that I can realize whatever happens to be unique and personal in my work.

He found interest in these subjects in his youth, stating

My father had a meat market and a grocery store in Youngstown, Ohio, right opposite the steel mills. They used to come and dump slag, and there would be these wonderful billows of smoke. It looked scary—it looked like hell—but it appealed to me, the ambiguity of it, the elegance, the beauty of the structure and, underneath it all, this hot fire, the energy of it. That contrast.

== Legacy ==
The Ernestine Betsberg and Arthur Osver Scholarship was established by the Sam Fox School of Design & Visual Arts at Washington University in St. Louis in Osver and Betsberg's honor in 2008.

== Selected paintings ==
- Interior (1939) -Weisman Art Museum, Minneapolis
- Melancholy of a Rooftop (1942) -Museum of Modern Art, New York City
- Sunday Morning (1942) -Kemper Art Museum, St. Louis
- The Majestic Tenement (1946) -Pennsylvania Academy of the Fine Arts, Philadelphia
- The Tanks (1946–1947) -The Museum of Fine Arts, Houston
- The Cluster (1947) -University of Michigan Museum of Art, Ann Arbor
- Chimneys and Buildings (1947) -Krannert Art Museum, Champaign
- Two Ventilators (1947) -Metropolitan Museum of Art, New York
- The Rainpipes (c. 1947) -Delaware Art Museum, Wilmington
- The Enclosure (1948) - Figge Art Museum, Davenport
- Greenpoint Chimneys (1948) - Walker Art Center, Minneapolis
- Under the Tracks (1951) -Saint Louis Art Museum, St. Louis
- Gray Night (1952) -The Phillips Collection, Washington D.C
- Big Withalacoochee (1953–1955) -Whitney Museum of American Art, New York City
- The Tall Green (1956) -Kemper Art Museum, St. Louis
- The Voyage (1961) - Smithsonian American Art Museum & Renwick Gallery, Washington, D.C.
- Shinnecock Green and Gray (1963) -Kemper Art Museum, St. Louis
- Duo (1966) -Saint Louis Art Museum, St. Louis
- G.P. 3-73 (1973) -Kemper Art Museum, St. Louis
- Soloist (no date) -Art Institute of Chicago, Chicago

== Awards ==
- 1947 Temple Gold Medal for The Majestic Tenement
- 1949 Guggenheim Fellowship
- 1951 Guggenheim Fellowship
- 1954 Rome Prize
- 1958 Rome Prize

== Publications ==
- Miller, Angela (Editor); 2018, Arthur Osver: Urban Landscape, Abstraction, and the Mystique of Place, Mildred Lane Kemper Art Museum, Washington University in St. Louis.
