= Ralph Van Deman Magoffin =

- Born: 8 August 1874
- Died: 16 May 1942 (aged 67)
- Education: University of Michigan
- Scientific career
- Fields: archaeology
- Workplaces: American Academy in Rome; Johns Hopkins University; New York University

Ralph Van Deman Magoffin (8 August 1874 – 16 May 1942) was an American Classical scholar and archaeologist.

He received his B.A. from the University of Michigan and his Ph.D. from Johns Hopkins University.

In 1907, Magoffin was a Fellow of the American Academy in Rome, during which time he studied the topography of ancient Praeneste. Magoffin taught Ancient history and Archaeology at Johns Hopkins University. He was from 1920 to 1921 affiliated with the American Academy in Rome and from 1923 to 1930 served as chair of the Department of Classics at New York University. From 1921 to 1931 he served as president of the Archaeological Institute of America.

Magoffin was the nephew of Esther Boise Van Deman.

== Publications ==
- 1908. A study of the topography and municipal history of Praeneste. (Johns Hopkins University studies in historical and political science, ser. 26., no. 9-10.) Baltimore: The Johns Hopkins Press. Available online at Project Gutenberg.
- 1929. (with Emily Cleveland Davis). The Romance of Archaeology, formerly Magic Spades.
