= Hilda Kristina Gustafson-Lascari =

Swedish sculptor (1885–1937)

- Born: Hilda Kristina Gustafson; December 18, 1885; Sweden
- Died: March 7, 1937 (aged 51); New York, New York
- Other names: Hilda Kristina Lascari

Hilda Kristina Gustafson-Lascari (1885–1937) was a Swedish born American sculptor.

Gustafson-Lascari née Gustafson was born on December 18, 1885, in Sweden. In 1916 she married fellow artist Salvatore Lascari. The couple settled in New York after traveling extensively in Europe.

Important pieces include The Awakening created in 1925, and Zephyr created in 1927.

Gustafson-Lascari was a member of the National Academy of Design.

She died on March 7, 1937, in New York City. She had been hospitalized for depression following a fire in her studio in 1937. She died by suicide the same year.
