= Philip J. Gentner =

American museum director

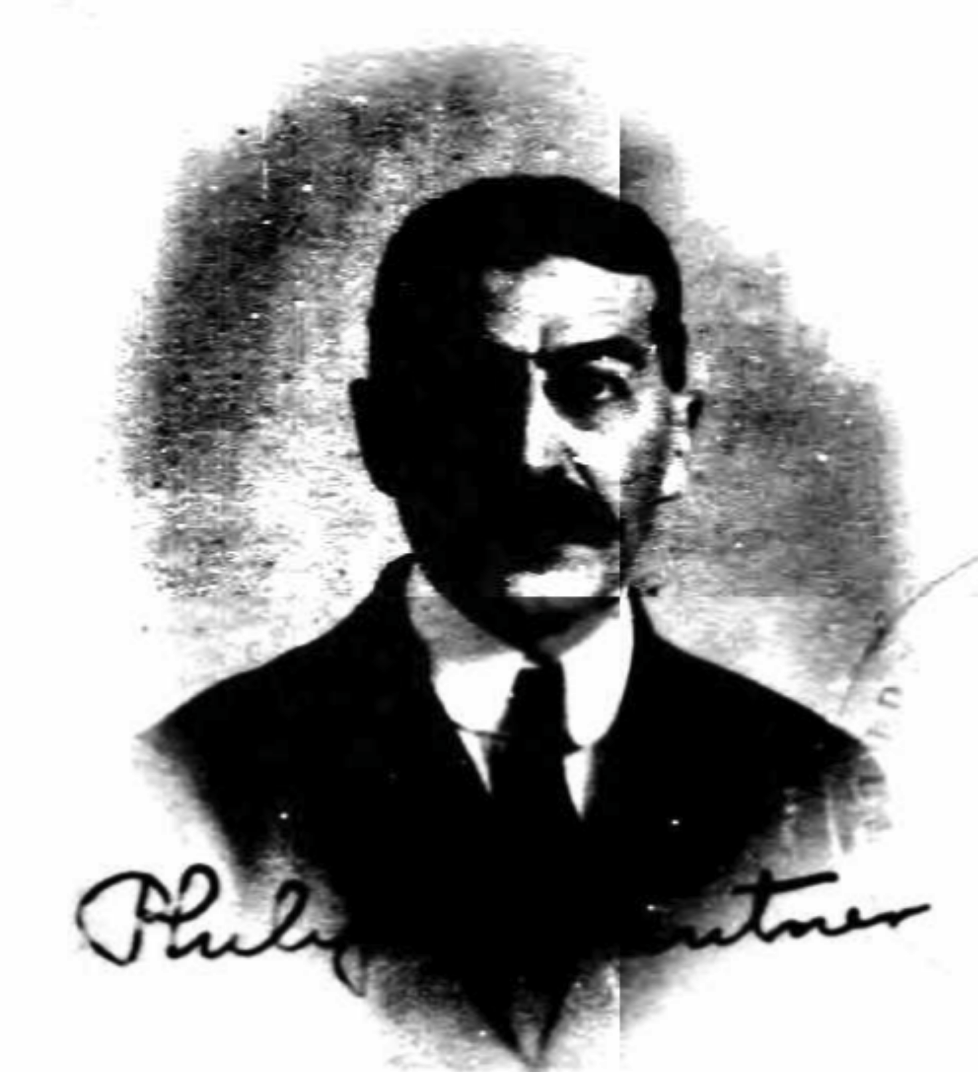
- Passport photo, 1917
- Born: Philip J. Gentler; December 9, 1872; Wilkes-Barre, Pennsylvania
- Died: October 20, 1941 (aged 69); Florence, Italy
- Occupations: Teacher; Museum director; Art dealer
- Known for: First museum director of Worcester Art Museum

Academic background
- Education: A.B., magna cum laude, 1898; A.M., 1900
- Alma mater: Harvard

Academic work
- Discipline: Classics, English literature

Philip Jacob Gentner (1872 – 1941) was an American educator, classicist, museum director, and art dealer.

== Early life and education ==
Philip J. Gentner was the son of Philip Gentner, a shoemaker from Württemberg, and Annie Gentner, native of Prussia. He was born December 9, 1872, in Wilkes-Barre, Pennsylvania. As of the 1880 census, he lived with his parents in Mantua, New Jersey.

Gentner was graduated from Bradford Area High School, in Bradford, Pennsylvania. He received his A.B. degree, magna cum laude, at Harvard University, having taken two years for study and travel in Europe before graduating in 1898. He returned to Harvard, where he held the Austin Teaching Fellowship while earning his A.M. degree in 1900.

Gentner married Marie Vuillerme in Florence, Italy, in October 1907. According to the U.S. census of 1910, Philip Gentner and his wife Mary were living in Worcester, Massachusetts. Their daughter Frances Mary was born April 15, 1910.

== Career ==
=== Educator ===
From 1898–1899, Gentner taught literature and fine arts at the University of Indiana. A classicist, in 1899 he edited four books of Pope's translation of the Iliad by Homer.

He was an instructor of English at Harvard for two years from 1899–1901, and then went abroad for two years. When he returned stateside, he was an instructor of English from 1904–1906 at the University of Wisconsin.

During Gentner's years in Europe in 1904–1907, he studied Italian literature at the American School of Classical Studies in Rome. He was a 1906–1907 Fellow of the American Academy in Rome, studying mediaeval and renaissance art.

=== Museum director ===
Gentner became the first director of the Worcester Art Museum in 1908, and he served there until 1917. He was characterized at the time of his hire as, "...a comparatively young man, who has had both American and cosmopolitan training".

The museum has described its collection as inclusive: "From the time of the first director, Philip J. Gentner... the Worcester Art Museum has been committed to acquiring works from all time periods and places."

According to author Louise Nicholson, Gentner shopped aggressively,

...for the Goodspeed Collection of American prints, drawings and photographs, and for paintings by Winslow Homer and John Singer Sargent. He blazed a trail for Worcester in acquiring British (Hogarth, Gainsborough) and contemporary American (Homer, Sargent) artists; in 1910 Worcester was the first U.S. museum to buy a water lilies painting by Monet.

The museum has called Gentner's 1909–1910 acquisition of Impressionist works as "forward-thinking", including the purchase of "two paintings by Monet directly from the artist's Parisian dealer Paul Durand-Ruel. The 1910 acquisitions of Waterloo Bridge (1903) and Water Lilies (1908) by the French artist were among the first paintings from these series collected by an American institution."

Additionally, Gentner's 1909 purchase of Mary Cassat's Mother and Child, "made Worcester Art Museum one of the first two American museums—along with the Metropolitan Museum of Art in New York—to purchase a Cassatt."

Gentner acquired ceramic specimens of the Tang and Ming Dynasties in 1912. He also purchased Sargent's, "Lady Warwick and Son", importing it in secret to avoid potential litigation in British courts.

=== Art dealer, collector ===
Gentner worked as an art dealer in Florence, Italy, for thirty years, from 1910–1941.

When Gentner died in October 1941, his wife was his sole beneficiary, but she was in a mental hospital in Florence. Mrs. Gentner's representative was her accountant, a man named Porzio; he sold Gentner's entire collection of French and Italian artworks to Florentine antiquarian Eugenio Ventura, for 1,450,000 lira.

However, according to Caterina Zaru, the sale of Gentner's collection came under suspicion: "...in particular it appeared that the sale was carried out in totally fraudulent conditions".

Porzio admitted, when questioned, that there had been far higher offers, but when Ventura referred to his own relationship with Mussolini, Porzio was convinced to make the deal. When interrogated, Ventura also admitted an ongoing relationship with agents of Göring. Porzi "declared that the visits from Göring's agents tended to induce him to sell the works that were part of this collection, without distinction between paintings and sculptures, orienting their requests to pieces of considerable value."

== Publications ==
- Homer (1899). Gentner, Philip (ed.). The Iliad. Books I, VI, XXII, and XXIV. Translated by Alexander Pope. B.H. Sanborn.

== Awards and honors ==
- B.A., magna cum laude, at Harvard University.
- Austin Teaching Fellowship, 1900, at Harvard.
- Fellowship in medieval and renaissance art in the American School of Classical Studies, 1906–1907.
- Award in Classical Studies and Archaeology from the American Academy in Rome in 1907.
