= William Germano =

American editor and college professor

Academic background
- Education: Columbia University (BA); Indiana University Bloomington (PhD)

Academic work
- Discipline: English literature
- Institutions: Cooper Union

William Germano is an American editor and college professor. He was editor-in-chief of Columbia University Press, then as vice-president and publishing director at Routledge, before becoming professor and dean of the faculty of humanities at Cooper Union.

== Biography ==
Germano was born and raised in Yonkers, New York. He received his B.A. from Columbia University and a Ph.D. from Indiana University Bloomington.

In 1982, Germano became the editorial director of Columbia University Press, publishing works by Paul Bové, Gayatri Spivak, as well as Paul de Man's last book, The Rhetoric of Romanticism.

After joining Routledge, he oversaw its publications in the field of science studies and cultural studies, promoting authors such as Judith Butler, Cornel West, bell hooks, Marjorie Garber, and Andrew Ross, and was considered "one of the most influential figures in literary criticism and theory over the past two decades."

In 2005, he left Routledge after it underwent corporate restructuring by owner Taylor & Francis. He joined Cooper Union and was dean of the faculty of humanities and social sciences from 2006 to 2017, and concurrently teaches English literature, lecturing on Shakespeare.

Germano has coauthored, with Kit Nicholls, a guidebook on the Syllabus, titled Syllabus: The Remarkable, Unremarkable Document That Changes Everything, and guidebooks on dissertation writing, including Getting It Published: A Guide for Scholars and Anyone Else Serious about Serious Books and From Dissertation to Book, both published by the University of Chicago Press.
