= Salvatore Lascari =

American artist

Salvatore Lascari

Salvatore Lascari (1884-1967) was an American painter, sculptor, and muralist.

Lascari was born in Sicily, studied c. 1902–1911 at the National Academy of Design. He won the Prix de Rome and spent three years at the American Academy before travelling through England, France, Spain and North Africa (1913–14). After his return to the United States, he married Hilda Kristina Gustafson in 1916. In 1918 he exhibited at the Pennsylvania Academy of the Fine Arts Annuals, and in 1919 at the Art Institute of Chicago. He and his wife traveled in Europe from 1919–1927. In 1927 he won a prize for his exhibit at the National Academy of Design, and also exhibited in Art Institute of Chicago in 1926, and the Pennsylvania Academy of the Fine Arts Annuals in 1928, as well as the National Sculpture Society Exhibition at the Whitney Museum of Art. He also served as an instructor at the National Academy from 1931 to 1941. Lascari was a member of The Society of Fellows of the American Academy in Rome, an Associate member of the National Academy, and a member of the Architectural League.

== Selected works ==
- The Arts, glass mosaics, Currier Gallery of Art, Manchester, New Hampshire (1931)
- Ceiling decorations for the William Welch Medical Library of Johns Hopkins Medical School, Baltimore
- Thanksgiving, a painting in the Smithsonian American Art Museum
- Mural decorations, Washington Irving High School, New York City.
