= William Stuart Messer =

American classical philologist

- Born: August 19, 1882; Washington, D.C.
- Died: December 21, 1960 (aged 78); Beverly, Massachusetts
- Awards: Rome Prize (1922)

Academic background
- Education: Columbia University (BA, PhD)

Academic work
- Discipline: Latin
- Institutions: Columbia University; Dartmouth College

William Stuart Messer (August 19, 1882 – December 21, 1960) was an American classical philologist. He was Daniel Webster Professor of Latin Language and Literature of Dartmouth College.

== Biography ==
Messer was born on August 19, 1882, in Washington, D.C., to William Messer and Charlotte Morris Taylor. He received his A.B. from Columbia University in 1905 and Ph.D. in 1917. In 1922, he received an honorary doctorate from the University of Padua and an honorary A.M. from Dartmouth College in 1923. Messer received a Rome Prize in 1922.

Messer was the head of the classical department of the Barnard School for Boys. He was an instructor at Columbia from 1911 to 1919, and joined the Dartmouth College faculty in 1919 and was Daniel Webster Professor in 1938 until his retirement in 1951.

Messer died on December 21, 1960, in Beverly, Massachusetts.
