= George W. Breck =

American mural painter

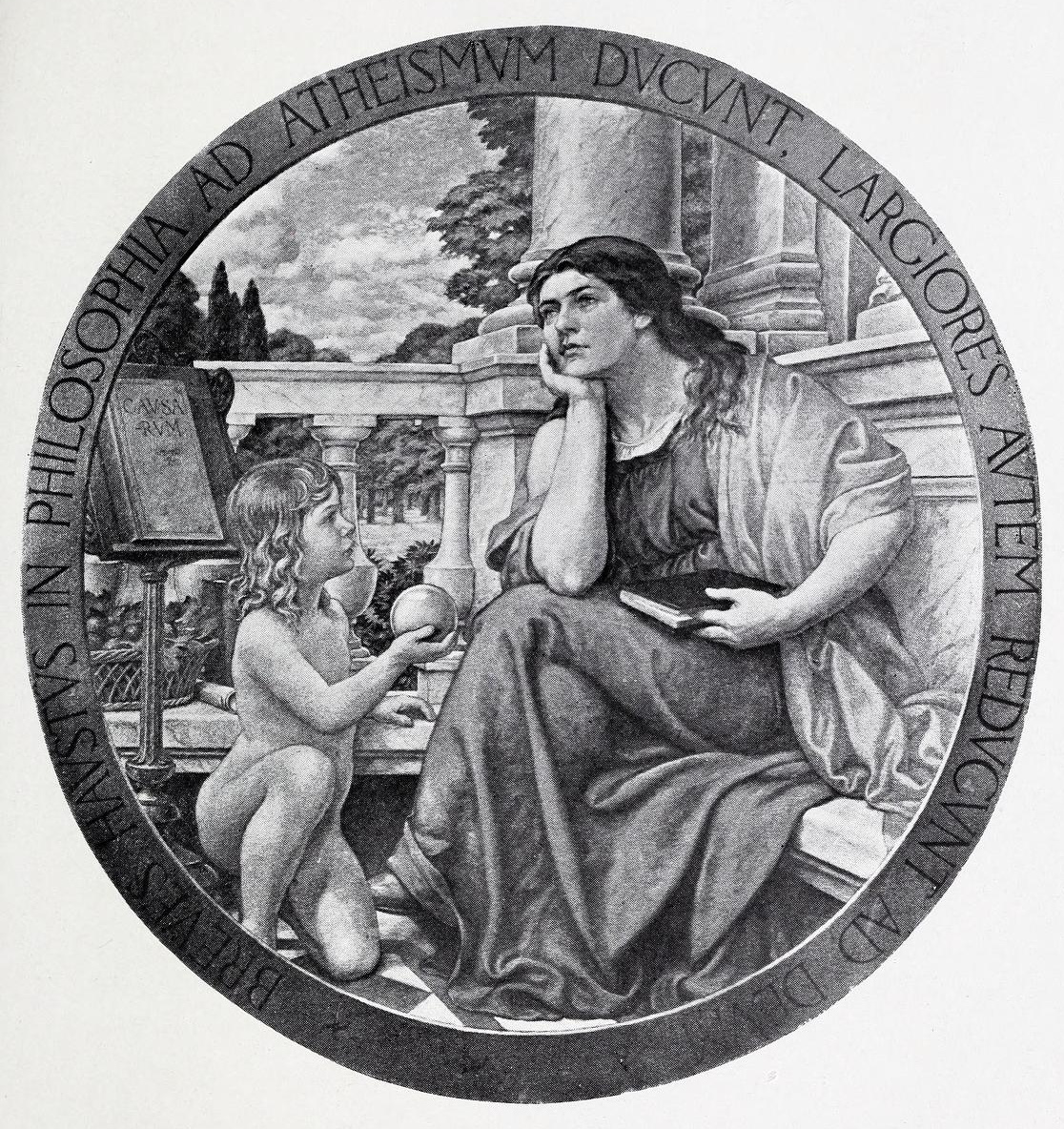
"Reflection", a ceiling panel by Breck made for the library of Whitelaw Reid

George William Breck (September 1, 1863 – November 22, 1920) was a prominent American mural painter.

Breck was born in Washington D.C. to John and Annie Auer Breck. He studied at the Art Students League of New York. In 1896 he won an additional scholarship that sent him to study at the American Academy in Rome, where he studied from 1897 to 1902. In 1903 he married Katherine Head, a native of Chicago.

He then served for a few years as president of the Arts Student League of Chicago. In 1904 his work earned him a silver medal from the St. Louis Exhibition, which was part of the St. Louis World's Fair and Olympics. Then from 1904 to 1909 he was director of the Academy of Fine Arts in Rome. In 1910 he moved to Flushing, New York and established his studio in New York City. He died in Flushing on November 22, 1920.
