= Cooper Union =

Private college in New York City

The Cooper Union for the Advancement of Science and Art
- Type: Private college
- Established: 1859; 167 years ago
- Accreditation: MSCHE
- Endowment: $920 million (2021)
- President: Steven W. McLaughlin
- Faculty: 57 (full time) (2017/2018)
- Undergraduates: 834
- Postgraduates: 72
- Location: Manhattan, New York City, New York, United States; 40°43′45″N 73°59′26″W
- Campus: Urban
- Colors: Maroon and Gold
- Nickname: Pioneers
- Website: cooper.edu

- The Cooper Union
- U.S. National Register of Historic Places
- U.S. National Historic Landmark
- New York State Register of Historic Places
- New York City Landmark
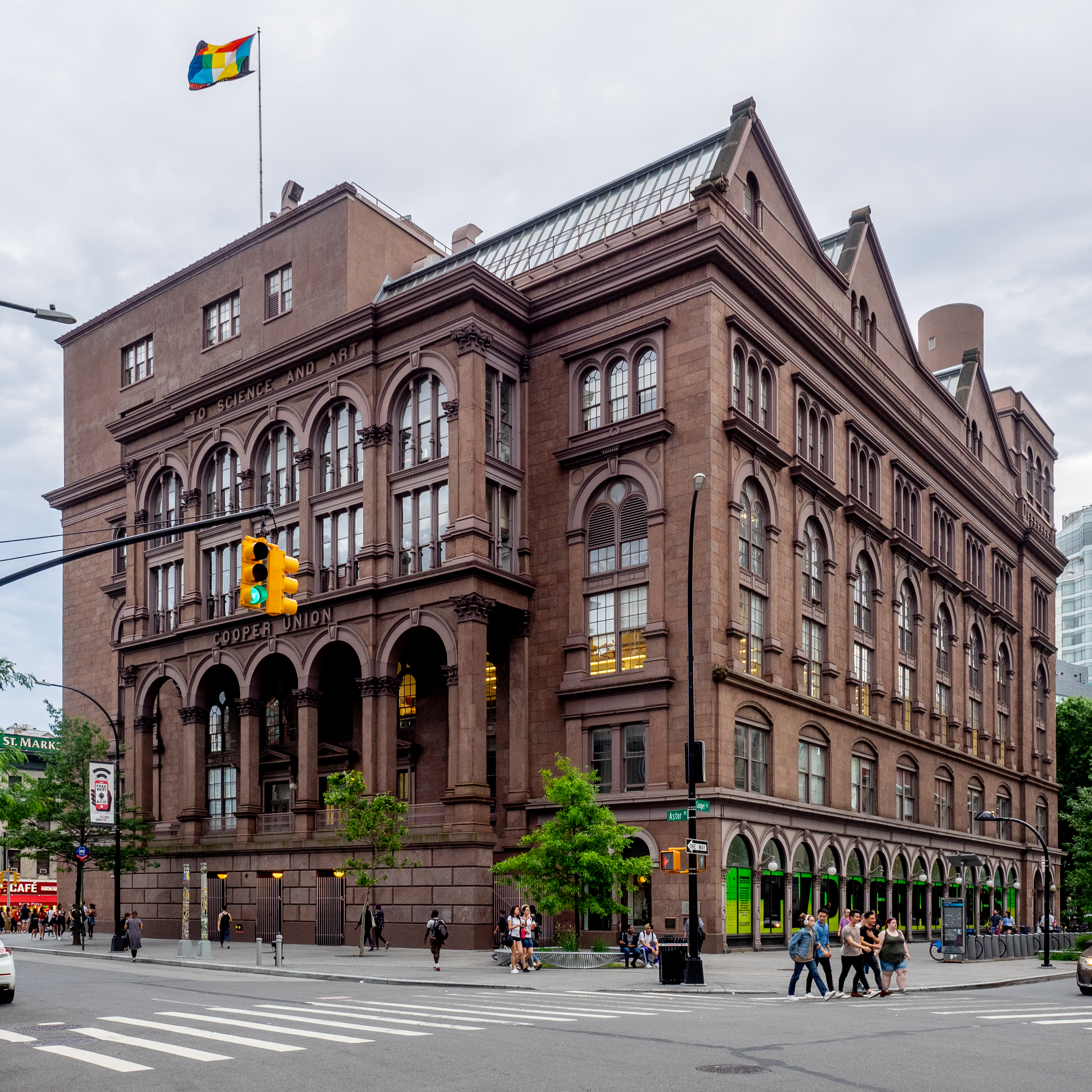
- The Cooper Union's Foundation Building at Cooper Square and Astor Place in 2019
- Location: Cooper Square; Manhattan, New York City
- Built: 1858–59
- Architect: F.A. Peterson
- NRHP reference No.: 66000540
- NYSRHP No.: 06101.000441

Significant dates
- Added to NRHP: October 15, 1966
- Designated NHL: July 4, 1961
- Designated NYSRHP: June 23, 1980
- Designated NYCL: March 15, 1966

The Cooper Union for the Advancement of Science and Art, commonly known as Cooper Union, is a private college on Cooper Square in Manhattan, New York City. Peter Cooper founded the institution in 1859 after learning about the government-supported École Polytechnique in France.

The school was built on a radical new model of American higher education based on Cooper's belief that an education "equal to the best technology schools established" should be accessible to those who qualify, independent of their race, religion, sex, wealth or social status, and should be "open and free to all".

The college is divided into three schools: the Irwin S. Chanin School of Architecture, the School of Art, and the Albert Nerken School of Engineering. It offers undergraduate and master's degree programs exclusively in the fields of architecture, fine arts (undergraduate only), and engineering, with a shared core curriculum in the humanities and social sciences.

The Cooper Union was one of very few American institutions of higher learning to offer a full-tuition scholarship to every admitted student, a practice it discontinued in 2014, instead offering a half-tuition scholarship to each admitted student. As of 2024, nearly half of its undergraduate students were attending on a tuition-free basis. In September 2024 the school announced that for the next four years, all students (including current students) would not pay tuition for their senior year.

== History ==
=== Founding and early history ===
The Cooper Union was founded in 1859 by American industrialist Peter Cooper, one of the richest businessmen in the United States. Cooper was a workingman's son who had less than a year of formal schooling. Despite this, he designed and built America's first steam railroad engine and made a fortune with a glue factory and iron foundry. He was a principal investor and first president of the New York, Newfoundland and London Telegraph Company, which laid the first transatlantic telegraph cable, and once ran for President under the Greenback Party, becoming the oldest person ever nominated for the office by a political party.

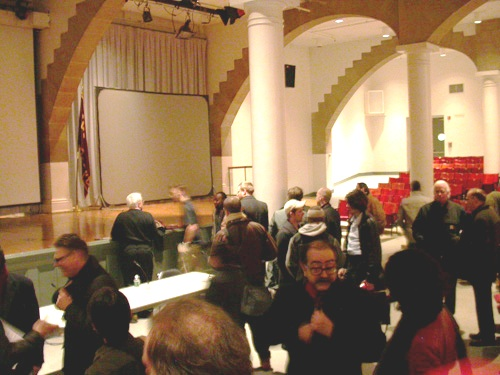
The interior of the Great Hall, c. 2005

Cooper's dream was to give talented young people a privilege he had lacked: a good education from an institution which was "open and free to all". To achieve these goals, Cooper designated the bulk of his wealth to The Cooper Union. According to The New York Times in 1863, "It was rare that those of limited means, however eager they might be to acquire a knowledge of some of the higher branches of education, could obtain tuition in studies not named in the regular course taught in our public schools." Discrimination based on ethnicity, religion, or sex was expressly prohibited.

=== Development after founding ===
Originally intended to be named simply "the Union", the Cooper Union began with adult education in night classes on the subjects of applied sciences and architectural drawing, as well as day classes primarily intended for women on the subjects of photography, telegraphy, typewriting and shorthand in what was called the college's Female School of Design. The early institution also had a free reading room open day and night, the first in New York City (predating the New York Public Library system), and a new four-year nighttime engineering college for men and a few women. In 1883, a five-year curriculum in chemistry was added as an alternative to the applied science (engineering) program. A daytime engineering college was added in 1902, thanks to funds contributed by Andrew Carnegie. Initial board members included Daniel F. Tiemann, John E. Parsons, Horace Greeley and William Cullen Bryant, and those who availed themselves of the institute's courses in its early days included Augustus Saint-Gaudens, Thomas Alva Edison and William Francis Deegan.

The Cooper Union's free classes have evolved into three schools: the School of Art, the Irwin S. Chanin School of Architecture, and the Albert Nerken School of Engineering. Since 1859, the Cooper Union has educated thousands of artists, architects, and engineers, many of them leaders in their fields.

After 1864 there were a few attempts to merge Cooper Union and Columbia University, but these were never realized.

The Cooper Hewitt, Smithsonian Design Museum, was founded in 1897 as part of Cooper Union by Sarah, Eleanor, and Amy Hewitt, granddaughters of Peter Cooper.

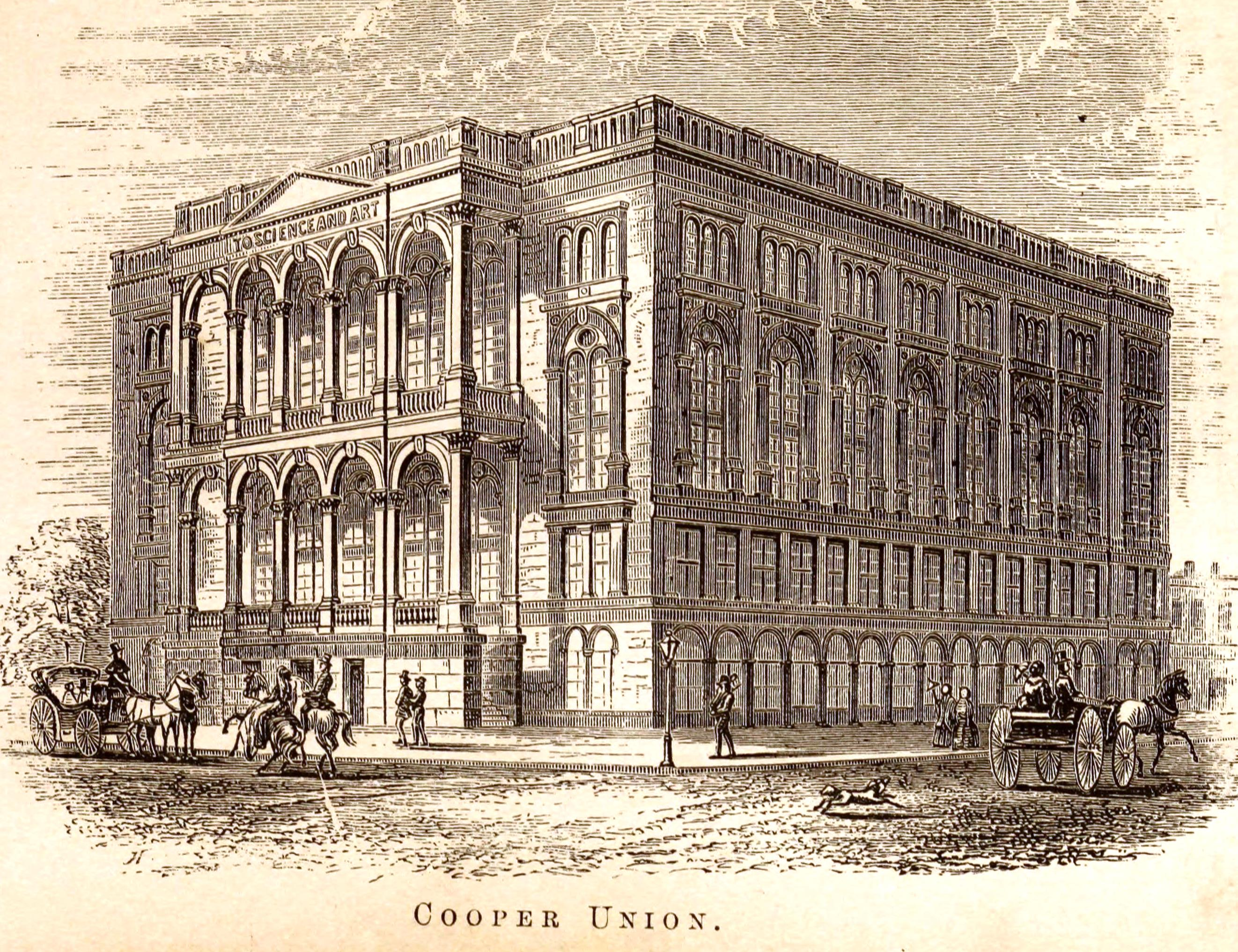
Cooper Union in 1876

=== Structure-building era ===
==== The Foundation Building ====
Cooper Union's Foundation Building is an Italianate brownstone building designed by architect Fred A. Petersen, one of the founders of the American Institute of Architects. It was the first structure in New York City to feature rolled-iron I-beams for structural support; Peter Cooper himself invented and produced these beams. Petersen patented a fire-resistant hollow brick tile he used in the building's construction. The building was the first in the world to be built with an elevator shaft, because Cooper, in 1853, was confident an elevator would soon be invented. However, he expected them to be cylindrical, so he designed the shaft in the shape of a circle. The building was declared a National Historic Landmark in 1961, and a New York City Landmark in 1965, and added to the Historic American Engineering Record in 1971.

==== The Foundation Building's Great Hall ====
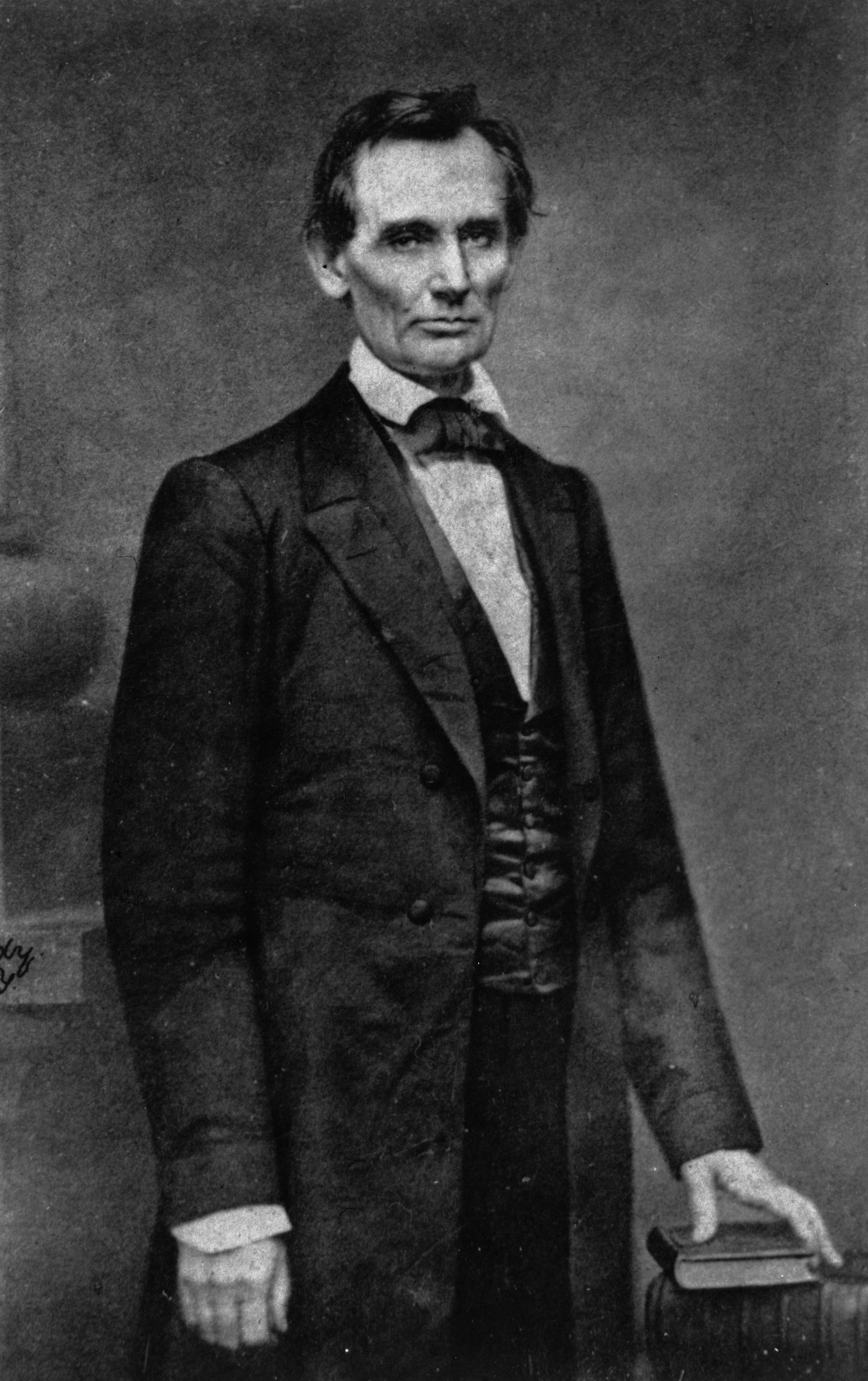
Presidential candidate Abraham Lincoln February 27, 1860, the day of his famous Cooper Union speech in New York

On February 27, 1860, the school's Great Hall, located in the basement level of the Foundation Building, became the site of a historic address by Abraham Lincoln. "Lincoln made his address on a snowy night before about 1,500 persons."

Widely reported in the press and reprinted throughout the North in pamphlet form, the speech galvanized support for Lincoln and contributed to his gaining the Party's nomination for the presidency. It is now referred to as the Cooper Union Address.

Since then, the Great Hall has served as a platform for historic addresses by American Presidents Grant, Cleveland, Taft, Theodore Roosevelt, Woodrow Wilson, and Bill Clinton. Clinton spoke on May 12, 1993, about reducing the federal deficit and again on May 23, 2006, as the Keynote Speaker at The Cooper Union's 147th Commencement, along with Anna Deavere Smith. He appeared a third time on April 23, 2007, along with Senator Edward Kennedy, Henry Kissinger, Norman Mailer, and others, at the memorial service for historian Arthur M. Schlesinger Jr. Most recently, Barack Obama delivered an economic policy speech at Cooper Union's Great Hall on April 22, 2010. On September 22, 2014, President of the Palestinian National Authority Mahmoud Abbas delivered his first formal speech in English in the Great Hall.

Other historic speakers in the Great Hall have included Frederick Douglass, Susan B. Anthony, Elizabeth Cady Stanton, and Mark Twain.

The Great Hall continues to serve as an important metropolitan art space and has hosted lectures and performances by such key figures as Joseph Campbell, Steve Reich, Salman Rushdie, Ralph Nader, Hamza Yusuf, Richard Stallman, Rudolph Giuliani, Pema Chodron, Michael Bloomberg, Evo Morales, and Venezuelan president Hugo Chávez. When not occupied by external or hosted events, the Great Hall is made accessible to students and faculty for large lectures and recreational activities, including the school's annual Culture Show. In 1994, the Cooper Union Forum of Public Programs was honored with a Village Award from the Greenwich Village Society for Historic Preservation.

Renovated Great Hall entrance, with main hall partially visible through open doors

In late 2008, the Great Hall was closed to students and outside events for the first major renovation of the hall since 1978. It reopened in March 2009.

The Cooper Union maintains an archive of ephemera and recordings from events that have taken place in the Great Hall through the Voices from the Great Hall Digital Access Project.

=== Modern changes ===
The Cooper Union has schools in architecture, fine art, and engineering. At present, these three fields represent Cooper Union's degree programs. The Faculty of Humanities and Social Studies provides classes and faculty to all three programs.

In 2002, the school decided to generate revenue by razing its engineering building and having it replaced with a commercial building, and replacing its Hewitt Building with a new building called 41 Cooper Square.

==== 41 Cooper Square ====
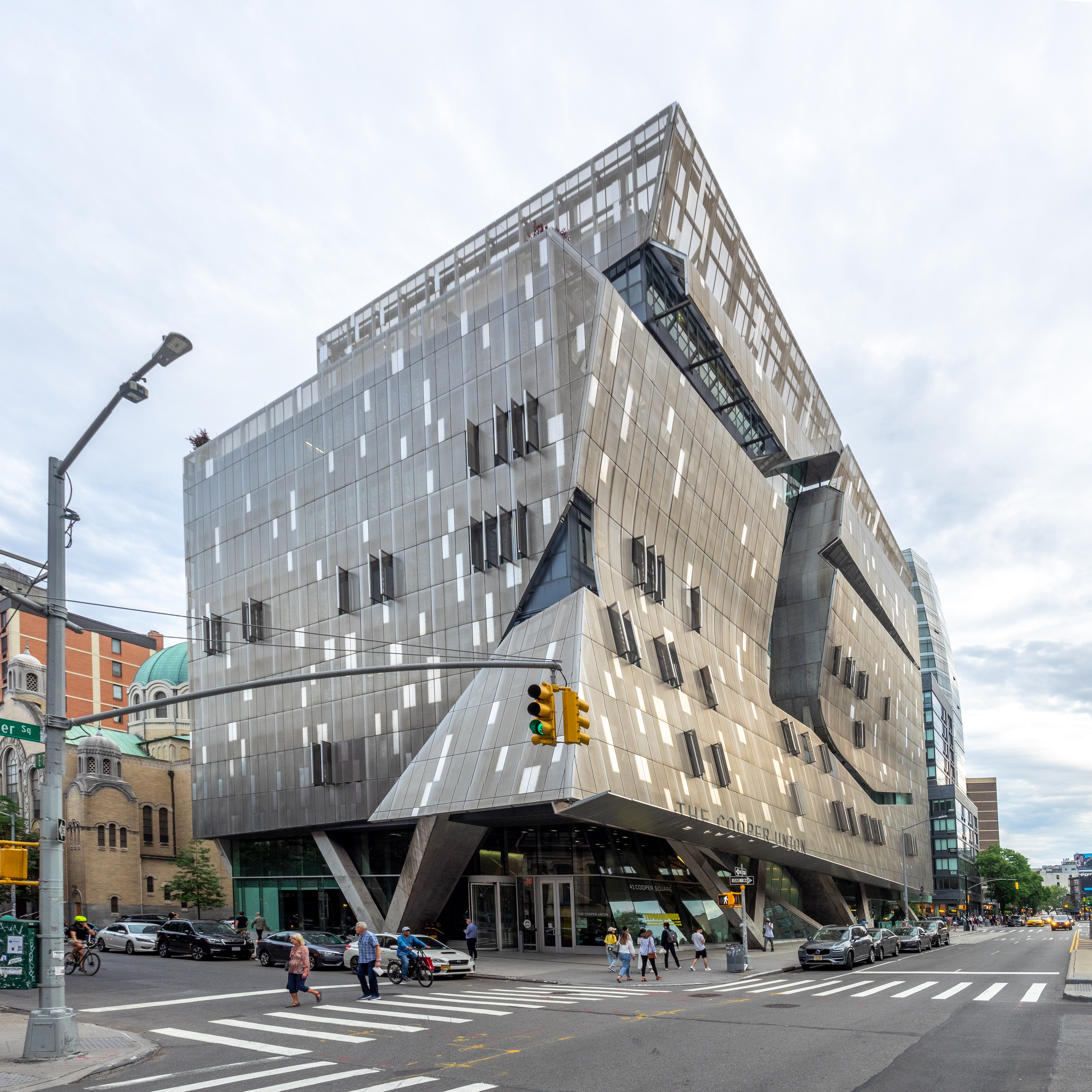
Cooper Union's 41 Cooper Square, seen from Cooper Triangle Park

A new classroom, laboratory, and studio facility designed by Thom Mayne replaced the aging Hewitt Academic Building at 41 Cooper Square. In contrast to the Foundation Building, 41 Cooper Square is of modern, environmentally "green" design, housing nine above-ground floors and two basements. The structure features unconventional architectural features, including a full-height Grand Atrium, prevalent interior windows, a four-story linear central staircase, and upper-level skyways, which reflect the design intention of inspiring, socially interactive space for students and faculty. In addition, the building's design allows for up to 75% natural lighting, further reducing energy costs. In 2010, 41 Cooper Square became the first academic and laboratory structure in New York City to meet Platinum-level LEED standards for energy efficiency. The building was funded in part by alumni donations, materialized in nameplates and other textual recognition throughout the building.

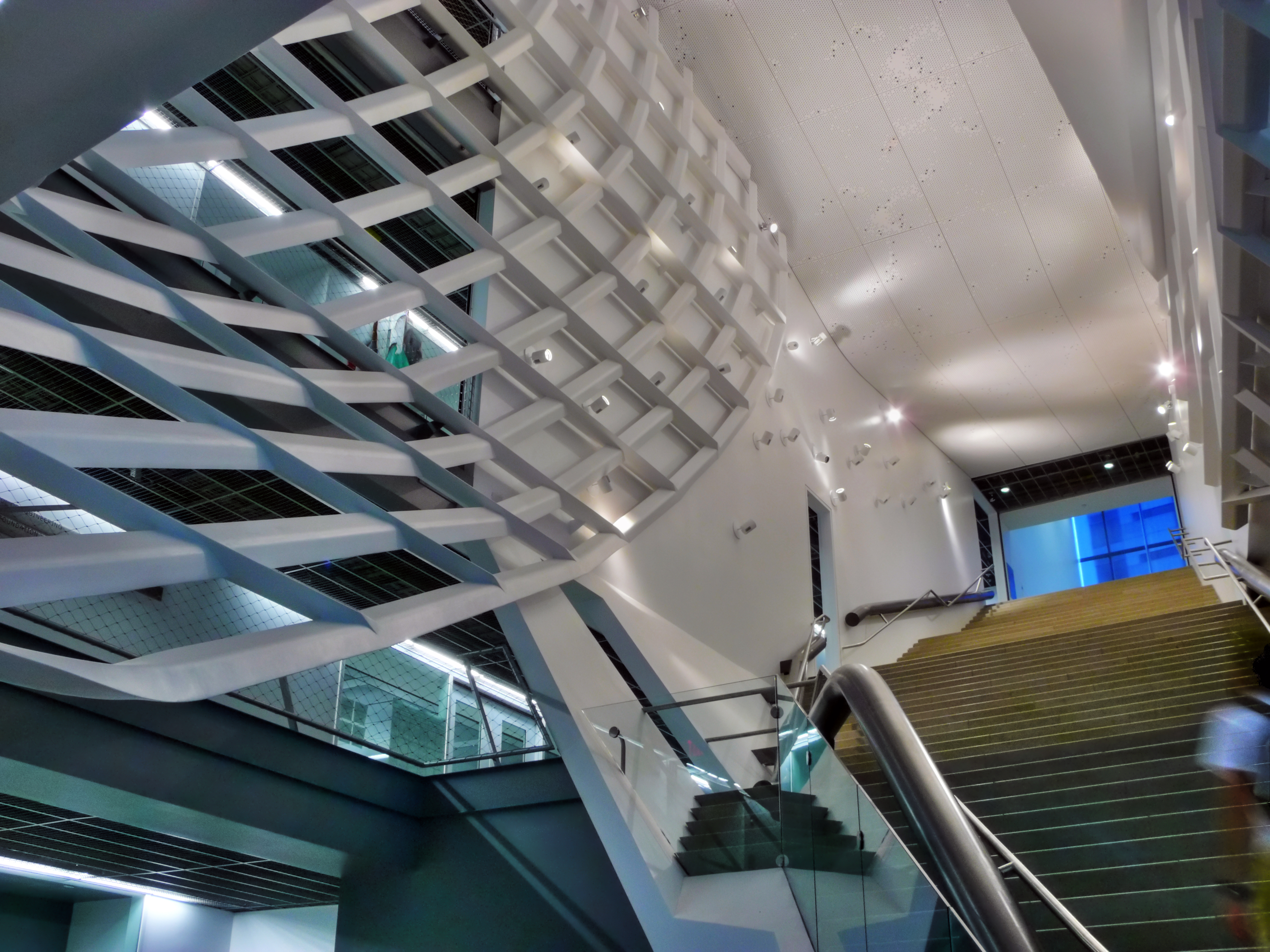
Main Atrium and Grand Staircase of 41 Cooper Square

Primarily designed to house the Cooper Union's School of Engineering and School of Art, the new building's first eight above-ground floors are populated by classrooms, small engineering laboratories, study lounges, art studio space, and faculty offices. The ninth, top floor is dedicated completely to School of Art studio and classroom space in addition to the art studio spaces located throughout the building. The lowest basement level consists almost completely of the school's large machine shops and design laboratories, as well as much of the HVAC and supply infrastructure. The building's first basement level houses primarily the Frederick P. Rose Auditorium, a 198-capacity lecture hall and event space designed as a smaller, more modern alternative to the Great Hall.

=== Antisemitism allegations ===
In January 2026, the Cooper Union reached a formal settlement with the U.S. Department of Education's Office for Civil Rights (OCR) to resolve a federal investigation into allegations of campus antisemitism. The probe focused on the institution's compliance with Title VI of the Civil Rights Act of 1964, particularly following an October 2023 incident in which Jewish students were required to shelter in a campus library during a pro-Palestinian demonstration. Under the settlement terms, the college committed to comprehensive institutional reforms, including the revision of its anti-harassment policies, the implementation of enhanced bias-incident reporting protocols, and mandatory training for staff and security personnel. This resolution is part of a broader series of federal inquiries into American higher education institutions regarding their handling of religious and ethnic discrimination amid heightened Middle East tensions, especially following the October 7, 2023, Hamas-Israel conflict and a surge in campus protests that triggered civil rights complaints and OCR investigations. While the agreement does not constitute an admission of liability by the Cooper Union, the administration has pledged to foster a campus climate that ensures the safety and inclusion of Jewish and Israeli students.

== Financial support ==
Spoken Article – Cooper Union (Financial Support)

A substantial portion of the annual budget, which supports the full-tuition scholarships in addition to the school's costs, is generated through revenues from real estate. Its endowment is over $600 million. The land under the Chrysler Building is owned by the endowment, and as of 2018, Cooper Union received $32.5 million per year from this parcel. Further, under a very unusual arrangement, New York City real-estate taxes assessed against the Chrysler lease, held by Aby Rosen, are paid to Cooper Union, not the city. This arrangement would be voided if Cooper Union sold the real estate. In 2026, Tishman Speyer and investment partners agreed to take over and upgrade the building which had fallen into disrepair.

=== Financial crisis and tuition controversy ===
Around October 29, 2011, rumors circulated the school was in serious financial trouble. On October 31, a series of open forums were held with students, faculty, and alumni to address a financial crisis.

Current and past students voiced opposition to charging tuition. The then-president of the school, Jamshed Bharucha, indicated depletion of the school's endowment required additional sources of funding. In 2012, the college announced approval from its board of trustees to attempt to establish a new tuition-based cross-disciplinary graduate program, expand its fee-based continuing education programs, and impose tuition on some students in its existing graduate programs.

In December 2012, as a protest against the possibility of undergraduate tuition being charged, 11 students occupied a suite in the Foundation Building for a week. Charging high tuition was complicated by the school's lack of customary amenities offered by other high-tuition schools.

The college ended its free tuition policy for undergraduates in 2014, but offers need-based tuition remission to incoming undergraduates on a sliding scale. On May 8, 2013, a group of students occupied President Bharucha's office in protest over news reports about ending free tuition. The administration, board of trustees, and those members of the Cooper Union community who had been occupying the Office of the President since early May reached an agreement that ended the occupation on July 12.

Throughout 2013, 2014, and 2015, the Committee to Save Cooper Union (CSCU) — a coalition of former and current students, alumni and faculty — campaigned to reverse this decision, urging the president and the board of trustees to return Cooper Union to "its tuition-free and merit-based mission, ensure the school's fiscal recovery, and establish better governance structures."

On September 1, 2015, the school and the CSCU announced the CSCU's lawsuit against the school's administration was resolved in the form of a consent decree signed by Cooper Union, then-New York State's Attorney General Eric Schneiderman, and the CSCU. The decree includes provisions for returning to a sustainable, tuition-free policy, increased board transparency, additional student, faculty and alumni trustees, an independent financial monitor appointed by the Attorney General, and a search committee to identify the next full-term president.

On January 15, 2018, the Free Education Committee (FEC) of the school's Board of Trustees released their recommended plan to return to full-tuition scholarships for undergraduates only by the academic year starting in the fall of 2028. In March 2018, the board released its approved, updated version with the same milestone. In 2024, the school announced that approximately 83% of undergraduate tuition costs would be covered by scholarships in the 2024–2025 academic year and that they were proceeding as planned towards their goal of 100% coverage in the 2029 fiscal year.

== Academics ==
Spoken Article – Cooper Union (Academics, et al.)

Admission to Cooper Union is highly competitive, with an acceptance rate of 12% across the three schools.

Academic rankings

Baccalaureate
- Washington Monthly: 1

Regional
- U.S. News & World Report: 2

=== The Albert Nerken School of Engineering ===
The Cooper Union's School of Engineering is named in honor of Albert Nerken, a chemical engineering alumnus of the school. Its enrollment includes about 550 students, and is the largest of the three schools by a significant margin. The school offers ABET-accredited Bachelor of Engineering (BE) degree programs in core engineering fields and an interdisciplinary Bachelor of Science in Engineering (BSE) degree. Opportunities are also available for engineering students to pursue minors in bioengineering, chemistry, computer science, humanities and social sciences, and mathematics.

Specialized facilities for teaching and research include the Maurice Kanbar Center for Biomedical Engineering established in 2002 and the interdisciplinary Maker Space Lab, established in 2020 for the use of engineering, art, and architecture students.

==== Master's in Engineering ====
The School of Engineering offers master's degrees in chemical, civil, electrical, or mechanical engineering. Cooper Union undergraduate engineering students may earn a bachelor's degree and a master's degree in as little as five years.

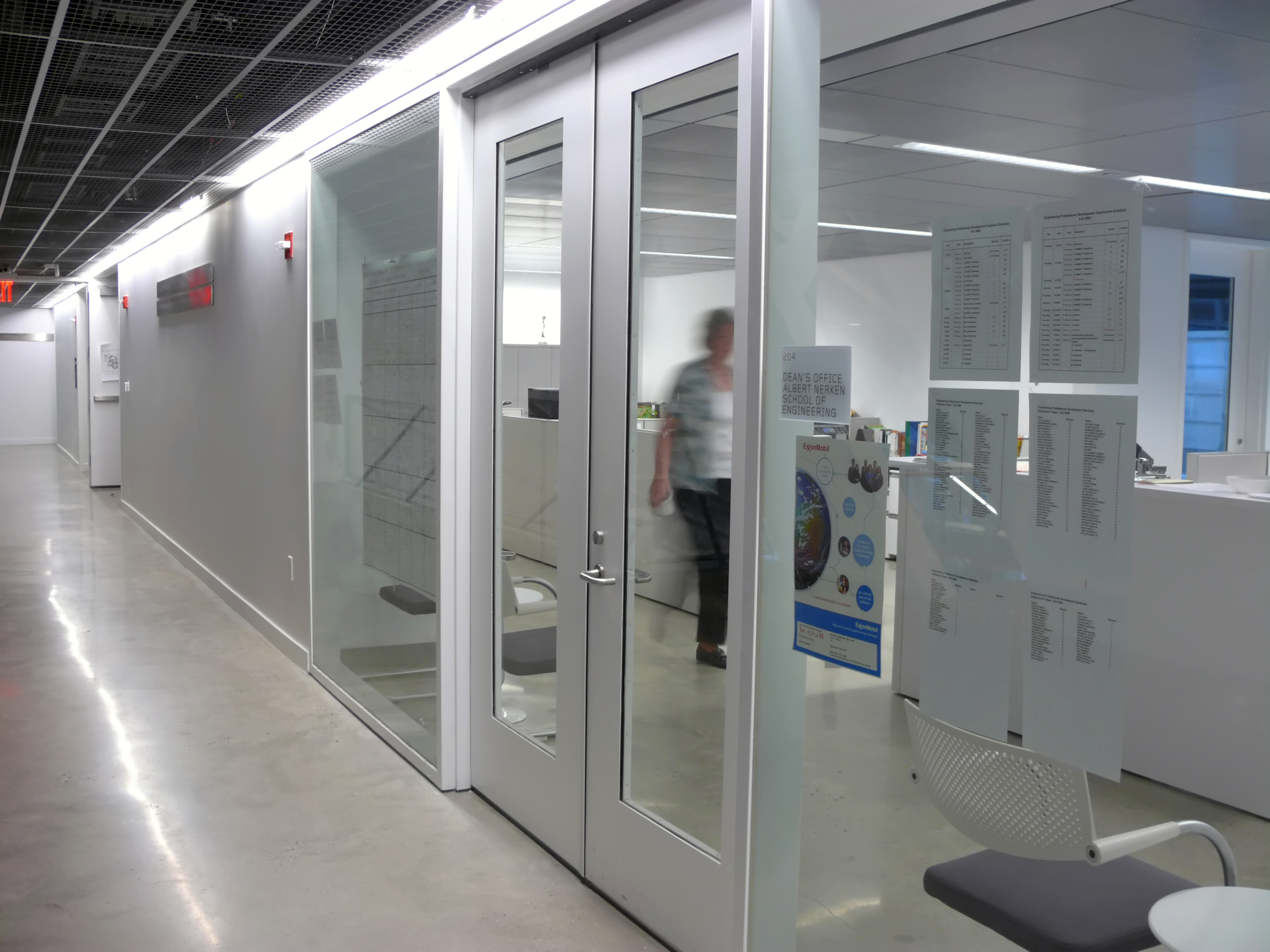
Albert Nerken School of Engineering main office, located on the second floor of 41 Cooper Square

=== The School of Art ===
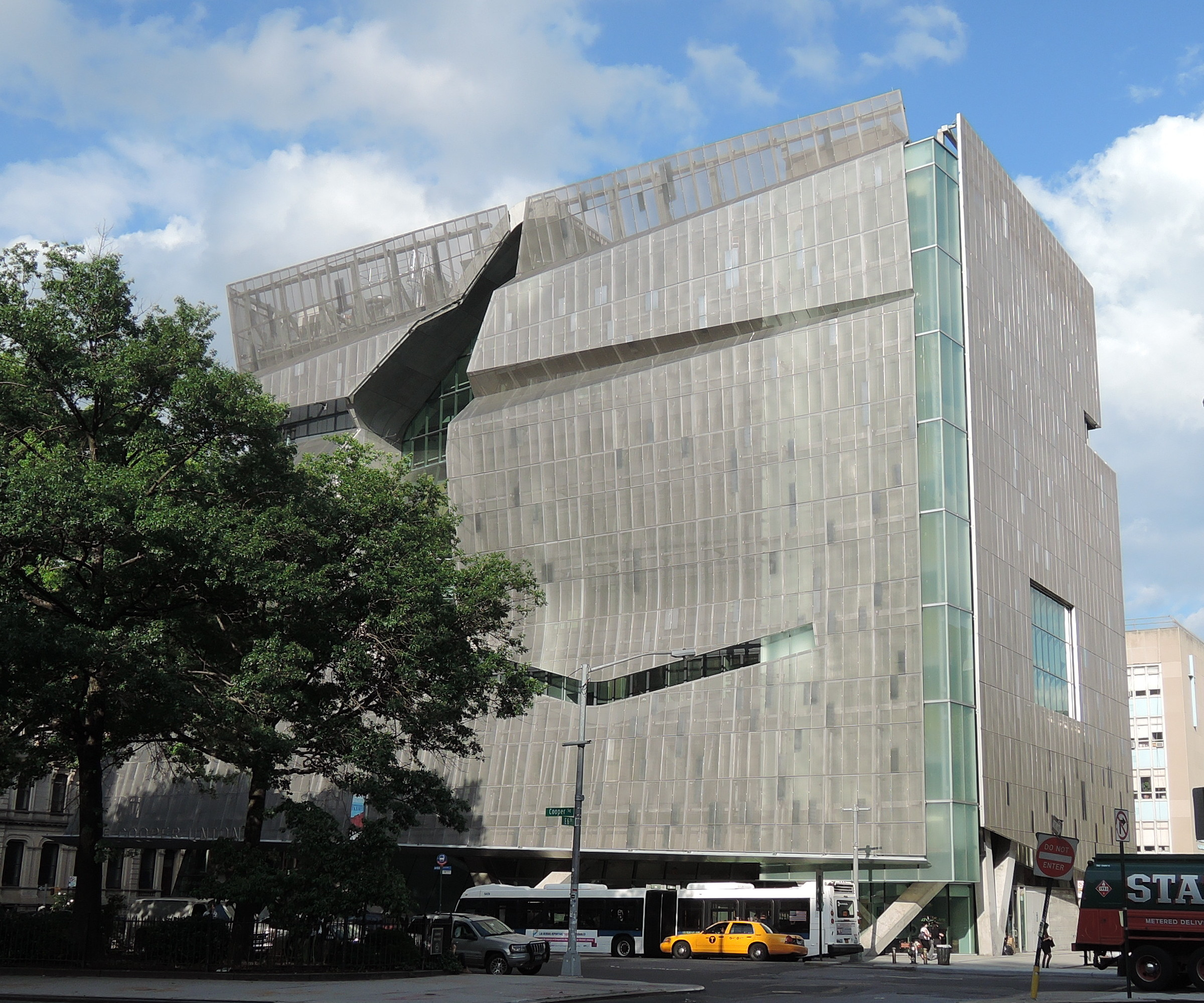
41 Cooper Square, where some of the art studios are located

Consisting of roughly 200 students and 70 faculty members, the Cooper Union School of Art offers a Bachelor of Fine Arts (BFA) degree and a Certificate of Fine Arts. As a member school of AICAD, School of Art students may participate in exchange programs with the other colleges in the association, including California Institute of the Arts and Otis College of Art and Design.

The Cooper Union Art program is often referred to as "generalist" or "versatile" when compared to other Fine Arts colleges; incoming students do not choose an academic major within the Fine Arts field, but instead are permitted and encouraged to select courses from any of the School of Art's departments. The curriculum place heavy emphasis on each student's creative and imaginative abilities, rather than technical precision in a specific medium.

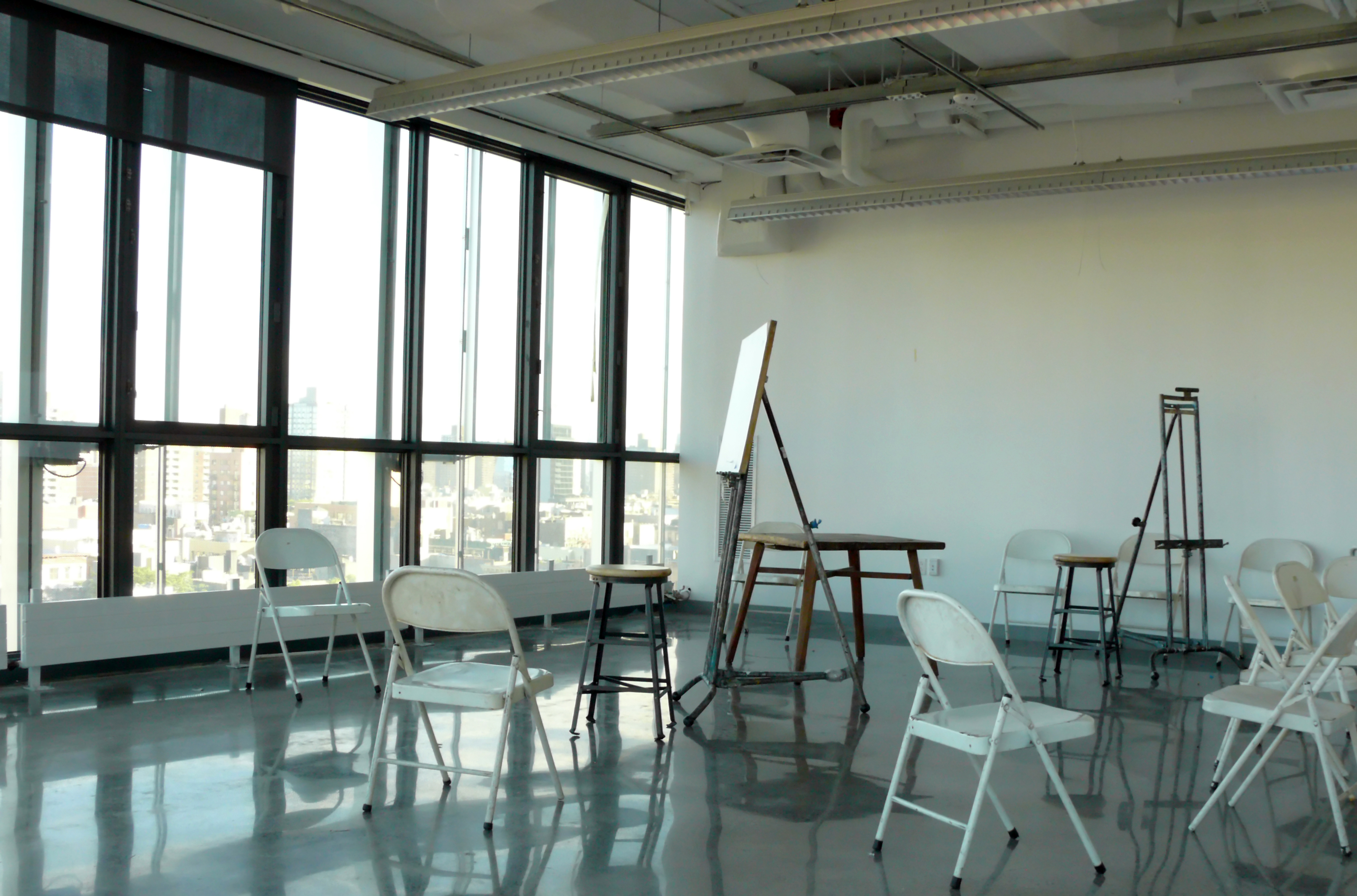
Painting/Drawing studio and classroom in 41 Cooper Square.

==== Galleries ====
Located in both public spaces and specialized rooms, Cooper Union's galleries provide space for installations and showcases by students, faculty, and guest artists. Popular gallery locations include the Great Hall lobby in the Foundation Building and newly opened 41 Cooper Gallery in 41 Cooper Square, which provides a two-story high space for large, three-dimensional exhibitions and works visible from both the building lobby and 7th street through large plate-glass windows.

In addition, numerous smaller exhibition spaces exist throughout both buildings on campus. Larger spaces on the upper floors of the Foundation Building are used primarily for interdisciplinary exhibitions with the School of Architecture. For presentations of video and digital media, the Great Hall and 41 Cooper Square's Rose Auditorium are used.

=== Irwin S. Chanin School of Architecture ===
The Irwin S. Chanin School of Architecture at The Cooper Union offers a five-year NAAB accredited program established by John Hejduk. The philosophical foundation of the school was directly committed to the "Social Contract" and dedicated to education as "one of the last places that protects freedom, and teaching as a sociopolitical act, among other things." Among those other things were principles of free debate and theoretical discourse which drew source from deep wellsprings of lost histories such as the Bauhaus school of Architecture founded by Walter Gropius.

The faculty includes architects, design and construction managers such as Peter Eisenman, Samuel Anderson, Nader Tehrani, and Diana Agrest. Former faculty members include the architects Michael Webb, Peter Eisenman, Raimund Abraham, Lebbeus Woods, Diane Lewis and John Hejduk.

==== Master of Architecture II ====
The post-professional degree program in architecture was launched in 2009. Concentrations in one or a combination of three areas are offered: theory, history and criticism of architecture, urban studies and technologies.

== Athletics ==
Cooper Union has developed an athletic program which fields teams in basketball, volleyball, and soccer.

== Notable alumni ==
Awards received by Cooper Union alumni include a Nobel Prize in Physics, a Pritzker Prize, 3 National Medal of Arts Awards, 15 Rome Prizes, 26 Guggenheim Fellowships, 3 MacArthur Fellowships, 9 Chrysler Design Awards, 3 Emmy Awards, a Tony, a Grammy, a SEA Write Award, a Queen Elizabeth Prize for Engineering, and 3 Thomas Jefferson Awards for Public Architecture. The institution has also had 40 Fulbright Scholars since 2001 and 13 National Science Foundation Graduate Research Fellowships since 2004.

== Notable faculty ==
Notable faculty of the Cooper Union include:

- Diana Agrest, architect
- Eleanor K. Baum, electrical engineer
- Peter Eisenman, architect
- William Germano, editor
- Hans Haacke, artist
- Lucy Raven, artist
- Stefan Sagmeister, artist

== In popular culture ==
Cooper Union has been used as a filming location for movie and television. Winter's Tale (2014) was filmed at Cooper's foundation building to fit the novel's early 1900 setting. Additionally, 41 Cooper Square was frequently shown in episodes of the television series Instinct, wherein it was depicted as the New York City Police Department's 11th Precinct.

== See also ==
- Presidents of Cooper Union
- Association of Independent Technological Universities
