= Hereward Lester Cooke =

American painter

Hereward Lester Cooke (1916–1973) was an American painter.

Cooke was born in Princeton, New Jersey in 1916. He studied at Oxford University, the Art Students League (under George Bridgman), the Yale University School of Fine Art, and Princeton University Graduate School, where he received his Ph.D.

Cooke is known more for his work in art history than for his painting, having written several texts, especially Painting Lessons from the Great Masters in 1967. He was the Curator of Painting at the National Gallery of Art from 1961 to 1973, and before that a National Gallery Aide and its acting assistant director, beginning in 1956. Part of his duties as curator included heading the Expert Opinions Section of the National Gallery, where owners of artworks could come and have their art appraised or otherwise identified. He was a well-known authority on fakes and forgeries and was called the "Sherlock Holmes of the Art World" for his work in solving art mysteries of attribution. As a curator, Cooke was also very influential in the government-sponsored art programs, helping to select artists for the Environmental Protection Agency art program and serving as art advisor to NASA for ten years. He organized the National Gallery Exhibit of NASA art in 1969.

Cooke's successes may have been more visible in art history, but he was also well regarded as an artist. Not only was he appointed director of the American pavilion at the Venice Biannual International Art Exhibition, he was also named artist-in-residence at Princeton for four years and later won the Prix de Rome and a Fulbright Fellowship. In 1940 he won the American Beaux Arts prize for murals. Cooke died in 1973.
