= Walter Dennison =

American classicist

Walter Dennison (August 9, 1869 - March 18, 1917) was an American classicist.

Dennison was born in Saline, Michigan. He graduated from the University of Michigan in 1893 with a Bachelor of Arts degree, in 1894 with a Master of Arts degree, and in 1897 with a PhD.

He received a prize in Classical Studies and Archaeology from the American Academy in Rome in 1897.
