= Edmund Taite Silk =

- Born: August 16, 1901; West Haven, Connecticut, U.S.
- Died: April 12, 1981 (aged 79); New Haven, Connecticut, U.S.
- Education: Yale University
- Occupation: Latinist

Edmund Taite Silk (August 16, 1901 - April 12, 1981) was an American Latinist. He was a professor of Latin at Yale University. He was a Guggenheim Fellow in 1942. Further, he curated the classical and medieval manuscripts at the Yale University Library from 1944 to 1959.
