= Paul MacKendrick =

American historian, author and teacher (1914–1998)

- Born: Paul Lachlan MacKendrick; February 11, 1914; Taunton, Massachusetts, U.S.
- Died: February 10, 1998 (aged 83); Madison, Wisconsin, U.S.
- Education: Harvard University (BA, MA, PhD); Balliol College, Oxford
- Occupations: Classicist; author; educator

Paul Lachlan MacKendrick (February 11, 1914 in Taunton, Massachusetts – February 10, 1998 in Madison, Wisconsin) was an American classicist, author, and teacher.

== Biography ==
MacKendrick was born in Taunton, Massachusetts, but most of his productive years had been lived in Madison, Wisconsin.

MacKendrick was educated at Harvard University (1934 B.A., summa cum laude; 1937 M.A.; 1938 Ph.D.) and Balliol College, Oxford, after which he taught at Phillips Academy for some years. Future United States President George H. W. Bush was a student of MacKendrick's while he taught at Phillips Academy. He joined the U.S. Naval Reserve and served from 1941 to 1945.

He taught at Harvard in 1946 and then moved to University of Wisconsin–Madison as assistant professor of Classics where he taught for six years. MacKendrick was named a professor of classics in 1952 and in 1975, the Lily Ross Taylor Professor of Classics. In all, he taught at the University of Wisconsin from 1946 to 1984.

In 1952, he worked with Herbert M. Howe on the publication of Classics in Translation, an anthology of selections by ancient Greek and Roman writers. In 1958, two books followed: The Ancient World, co-authored with Vincent M. Scramuzza and The Roman Mind At Work.

He is most widely known for a series of books that utilise the discoveries of archeology to reconstruct the histories of particular cultures or civilizations. The first of these, The Mute Stones Speak, surveys the cultures of the Italian peninsula from prehistoric times, with emphasis on the Romans, to the adoption of Christianity as the official religion of the empire in 324 A.D.

The Greek Stones Speak followed in 1962. Starting with Troy and Heinrich Schliemann's excavations, the reader is told of excavations of major centers of the Hellenic world, including the story of Michael Ventris' decipherment of Linear B.

Several additional titles appeared in this series, and by 1980 it had surveyed regions and cultures of almost the entire area of the Roman Empire.

Professor MacKendrick had retired from teaching in 1984.

== Honors ==
- Fulbright Fellowship, 1950–51
- Guggenheim Fellowship, 1957–58
- Consultant, Greek archeology, National Broadcasting Company
- Consultant, Roman archeology, Time-Life, Inc.

== Awards ==
- 1984 Notable Wisconsin Authors - Wisconsin Library Association Literary Awards Committee

== Selected books ==
- Classics In Translation (with Herbert M. Howe), 1952
- The Ancient World (with Vincent M. Scramuzza), 1958
- The Roman Mind At Work, 1958
- The Mute Stones Speak, 1960
- The Greek Stones Speak, 1962
- The Iberian Stones Speak, 1969
- The Athenian Aristocracy, 339-31 B.C., 1969
- Romans On The Rhine, 1970
- Roman France, 1972
- The Dacian Stones Speak, Chapel Hill: University of North Carolina Press, 1975. ISBN 0-8078-1226-9
- The North African Stones Speak, 1980
