= Samuel Anderson Architects =

- Formerly: Anderson Kastner Architects
- Industry: Architecture
- Founded: New York City, New York, United States, 1991
- Founder: Samuel Anderson; Johannes Kastner-Lanjus
- Headquarters: New York City, New York, United States
- Area served: United States
- Owner: Samuel Anderson
- Website: samuelanderson.com

Samuel Anderson Architects is a New York-based architecture firm specializing in institutional art projects. SAA has completed designs for numerous museum clients throughout the United States.

== History ==
Samuel Anderson Architects was founded in 1993 as a successor to Anderson Kastner Architects. Anderson graduated cum laude from Harvard University in 1975. After a fellowship at Sussex University, he received his professional architecture degree from Cooper Union. He then began his career at Smith-Miller and Hawkinson Architects in New York, moving on to Gwathmey Siegel & Associates Architects in 1987. While at the latter firm, he oversaw construction of the Stevenson Dining and Social Center (now known as the Stevenson Event Center) at Oberlin College and the Busch-Reisinger Museum's Fine Arts Library at his alma mater Harvard University. He is, also, an adjunct professor at his other alma mater, Cooper Union, where he teaches building technology and studio design courses.
