= William Kendall Denison =

American classicist and educator (1869–1963)

William Kendall Denison (May 17, 1869 in Irasburg, Vermont – August 23, 1963) was an American classicist, and educator.

He graduated from Tufts College in 1891, and Harvard College with an AM in 1892. He taught at Tufts College. He received a prize in Classical Studies and Archaeology from the American Academy in Rome in 1896.

He was an executive committee member of the Archaeological Institute of America.

He married Florence Howland in 1904; they had three children.

== Awards ==
- 1896 Rome Prize
