= William Thon =

American painter (1906–2000)

William Thon (1906 – December 6, 2000) was an American painter.

== Biography ==
Thon was born in New York City in 1906. He spent his childhood summers camping on Staten Island. He joined the Navy during World War II, and shortly after the war won the Rome Prize, a fellowship to the American Academy in Rome. He later became a trustee of the Academy. In 1951, Thon received a grant from the American Academy of Arts and Letters. He taught painting at Ohio University, and he painted aspects of the Apollo Space Program for the NASA Fine Arts Program.

William Thon had no formal art training apart from 30 days at the Art Students League. He discovered his individual style through trial and error. He began painting in oil in a fairly realistic mode, but during his stay at the American Academy in Rome he discovered watercolor as a serious medium and began to loosen his style some. His work became more abstract, although the sources were still recognizable. Perhaps the major breakthrough for his painting came with the discovery of an abandoned quarry near his home in Maine. Here he painted spidery trees with rectilinear slabs of granite interspersed, such as in Midnight Quarry. While still based in nature, these were by far the most abstract of his paintings thus far.

Thon died in Port Clyde, Maine on December 6, 2000.
