= Herbert Edward Everett =

University of Pennsylvania professor

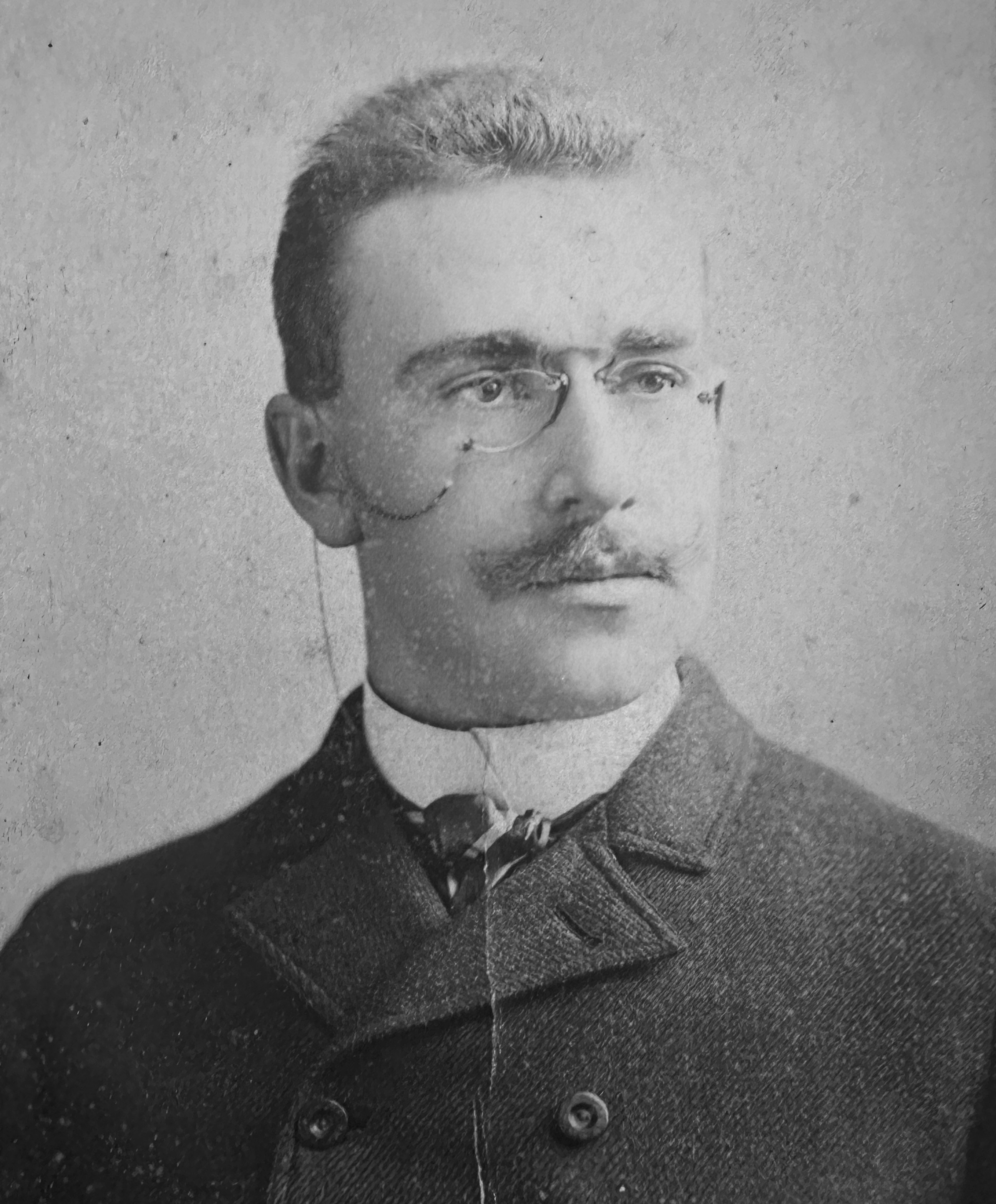
Everett in 1885

Herbert Edward Everett (February 16, 1863 – December 10, 1932) was an American artist, author and professor born in Worcester, Massachusetts. Everett was named the first University of Pennsylvania professor of the history of art in 1905.

== Education ==
Herbert E. Everett graduated from the Worcester, Massachusetts public school 1868–1880. He studied and practiced wood engraving from 1880 to 1887. Everett also studied at the Boston Museum of Fine Arts, 1887–1890; Harvard University, 1886–1887; the Julien Academy in Paris, 1893; and the Academy of Fine Arts in Philadelphia, 1894. He was an Assistant Professor of Interior Decoration at the University of Pennsylvania, 1894–1905, and in 1905 he was named Professor of the History of Art at the school.

== Named a Fellow in Mediaeval and Renaissance Archaeology ==
The Committee on Mediaeval and Renaissance Archaeology, (authorized by the Council of Archaeological Institute of America) appointed Mr. Herbert Edward Everett as Fellow for 1905–06, and he was adopted as a Fellow of the American School of Classical Studies in Rome. While in Rome, he devoted his energies to the study of Italian Painting. His investigations led to the discovery of many interesting facts concerning Antoniazzo, one of the very few Italian painters native to Rome in the fifteenth century. His thesis entitled "Antoniazzo Romano" was published in 1907. After his appointment to the Fellowship Everett was made Professor of the History of Art in the University of Pennsylvania, with the task of founding a new department.

Herbert Everett was awarded the Rome Prize in 1906 in the category of Classical Studies & Archaeology. The Rome Prize is an award made annually by the American Academy in Rome since 1896 through a national competition of American Artists and Scholars.

Everett received his Doctorate of Fine Arts in May 1921.

== Published works ==
Antoniazzo Romano by Herbert E Everett 1907. American Journal of Archaeology, Vol. 11, No. 3 (July–September, 1907).

Freehand and Perspective Drawing by Herbert E Everett, 1907.
