= Esther Boise Van Deman =

American archaeologist

- Born: October 1, 1862; South Salem, Ohio
- Died: May 3, 1937 (aged 74); Rome, Italy
- Citizenship: American
- Education: University of Michigan
- Known for: Roman archaeology
- Scientific career
- Fields: Archaeology
- Thesis: "The Cult of Vesta Publica and the Vestal Virgins" (1898)

Esther Boise Van Deman (October 1, 1862 – 3 May 1937) was an American archaeologist who developed techniques that allowed her to estimate the building dates of ancient buildings in Rome.

== Life ==
Esther Boise Van Deman was born in South Salem, Ohio, to Joseph Van Deman and his second wife, Martha Millspaugh. She was the youngest of six children, including two boys by her father's first marriage.

== Education and career ==
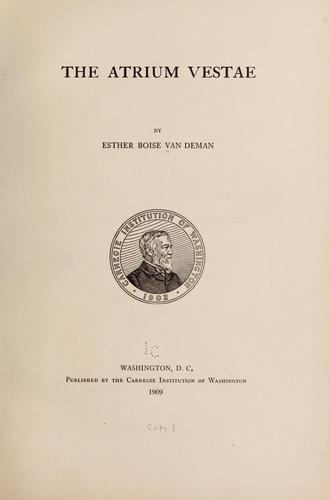
The Atrium Vestae, 1909

In 1883, Van Deman began studying at the College of Emporia, in Emporia, Kansas. In 1886, she was accepted to the University of Michigan in Ann Arbor, from which she graduated with an A.B. in Latin in 1891. From 1889 she worked closely with the new, young Professor Francis Kelsey, who encouraged her to study the cult of the Vestal Virgins. She stayed at Michigan, becoming one of the first women to undertake post-graduate studies there, and received her A.M. in 1891. She then became the first fellow in Latin at Bryn Mawr College, Pennsylvania. Moving to Baltimore she taught Latin at Wellesley College, then Bryn Mawr School. In 1895 she presented a paper, "The Duties of the Vestals" at a conference organised by Kelsey. She commenced studying for her doctorate at the University of Chicago in 1896 and became the first woman to be awarded a PhD in Latin there in 1898; her thesis again focused on the Vestal Virgins. She then taught Latin at Mount Holyoke College from 1898 to 1901

In 1901 Van Deman travelled to Rome, assisted by her mentor Kelsey, to gather further material on the Vestal Virgins. The House of the Vestal Virgins was being excavated at the time and Van Deman regularly observed the dig and examined the finds. She returned to America in 1903 to become an associate professor at Goucher College teaching Latin and classical archaeology. In 1905 she returned to Rome. In 1906 she won a Carnegie Institution fellowship, which allowed her to study with the American School of Classical Studies in Rome for three years. She was the third woman to have been awarded this fellowship.

From 1910 to 1925 she was an associate of the Carnegie Institution in Washington, D.C. Between 1925 and 1930 she taught Roman archaeology at the University of Michigan.

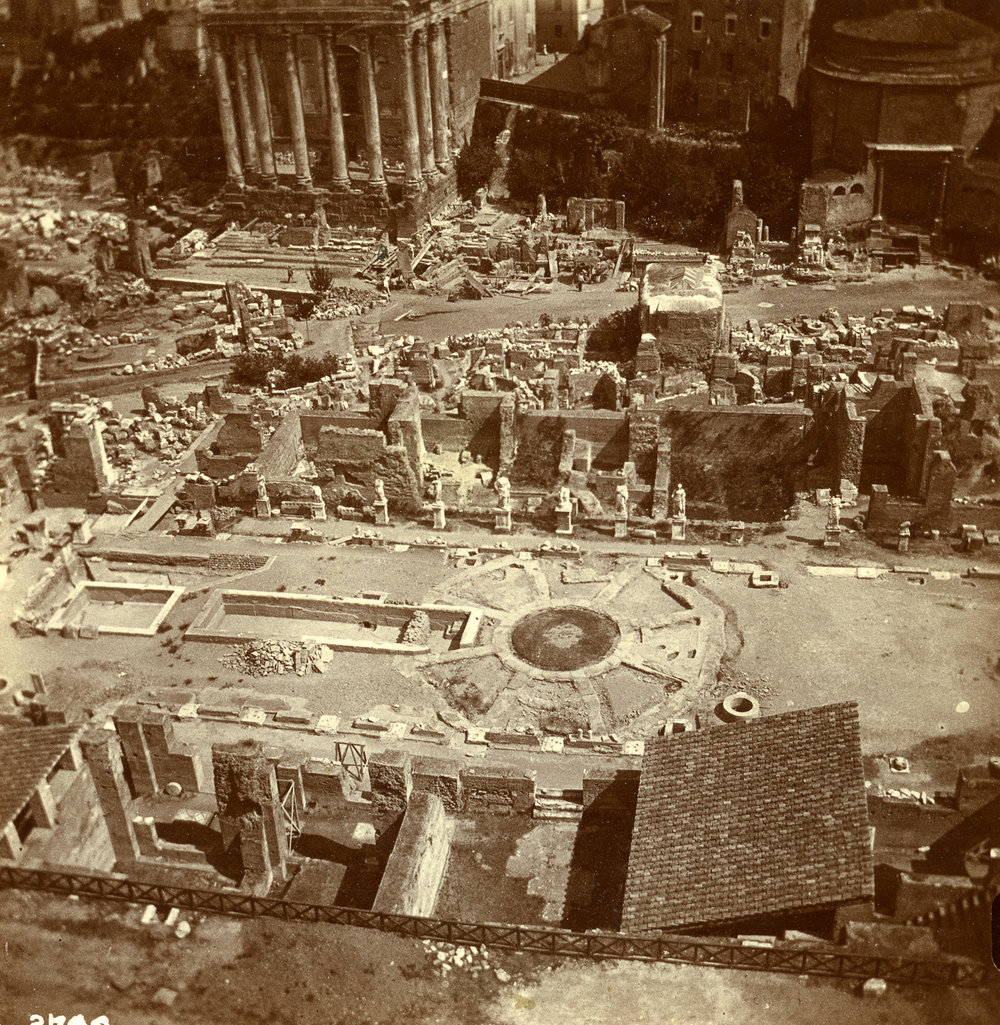
Esther Boise Van Deman's 1903 photo of the Columns of the Temple of Mars

Her life's work centered around the analysis of building materials to establish a chronology of construction on ancient sites. In 1907, while attending a lecture in the Atrium Vestae in Rome, Van Deman noticed that the bricks blocking up a doorway differed from those of the structure itself and showed that such differences in building materials provided a key to the chronology of ancient structures. The Carnegie Institution published her preliminary findings in The Atrium Vestae (1909). Van Deman extended her research to other kinds of concrete and brick construction and published "Methods of Determining the Date of Roman Concrete Monuments" in The American Journal of Archaeology. Her basic methodology, with few modifications, became standard procedure in Roman archaeology. During her time in Rome up to 1925 she took many photographs of her work to record archaeology. Van Deman's major work, written after she retired and settled in Rome, was The Building of the Roman Aqueducts (1934). She died in Rome, Italy, on May 3, 1937. She is buried in the Protestant Cemetery in Rome, near the Porta Ostiense. At the time of her death, Van Deman was at work on a monograph-length study of Roman construction. Her work was completed and published by Marion Elizabeth Blake (1882–1961).

Van Deman's nephew, Ralph Van Deman Magoffin (1874–1942), published a study of the Italian city of Praeneste. His interest in archaeology may have been sparked by his aunt.

== Works ==
- "The Value of Vestal Statues as Originals", American Journal of Archaeology 12.3 (July-Sept. 1908) 324-342
- The Atrium Vestae 1909
- The So-Called Flavian Rostra 1909
- "Methods of Determining the Date of Roman Concrete Monuments", American Journal of Archaeology. April–June 1912
- The Porticus of Gaius and Lucius 1913
- "The Sullan Forum", Journal of Roman Studies 1922
- The Sacra Via of Nero 1925
- The Building of the Roman Aqueducts 1934

== Notes, citations and sources ==
=== Sources ===
Welch, Katherine (2004). "Esther Boise Van Deman (1862-1937)". In Cohen, Getzel M.; Joukowsky, Martha Sharp (eds.). Breaking Ground: Pioneering Women Archaeologists. Ann Arbor, Michigan: University of Michigan Press. pp. 68–108. ISBN 0472113720.
