= Andrew Thomas Schwartz =

American painter

Andrew Thomas Schwartz (January 1867 in Louisville, Kentucky – September 16, 1942) was an American painter noted for his murals. He studied with Frank Duveneck at the Cincinnati Art Academy and with Harry Siddons Mowbray at the Art Students League of New York.

Schwartz was appointed Assistant to Mowbray in decorating the University Club and J.P. Morgan's private library in New York. Amongst his most important works, are those at the Baptists Church, S. Londonderry, VT; Kansas City Life Insurance Co. Bldg., MO; murals for the stairway inside the Nelson-Atkins Museum of Art, Kansas City; West Side YMCA, NYC. He exhibited in New York, Chicago, Philadelphia, Pittsburg, Cincinnati, and Boston.

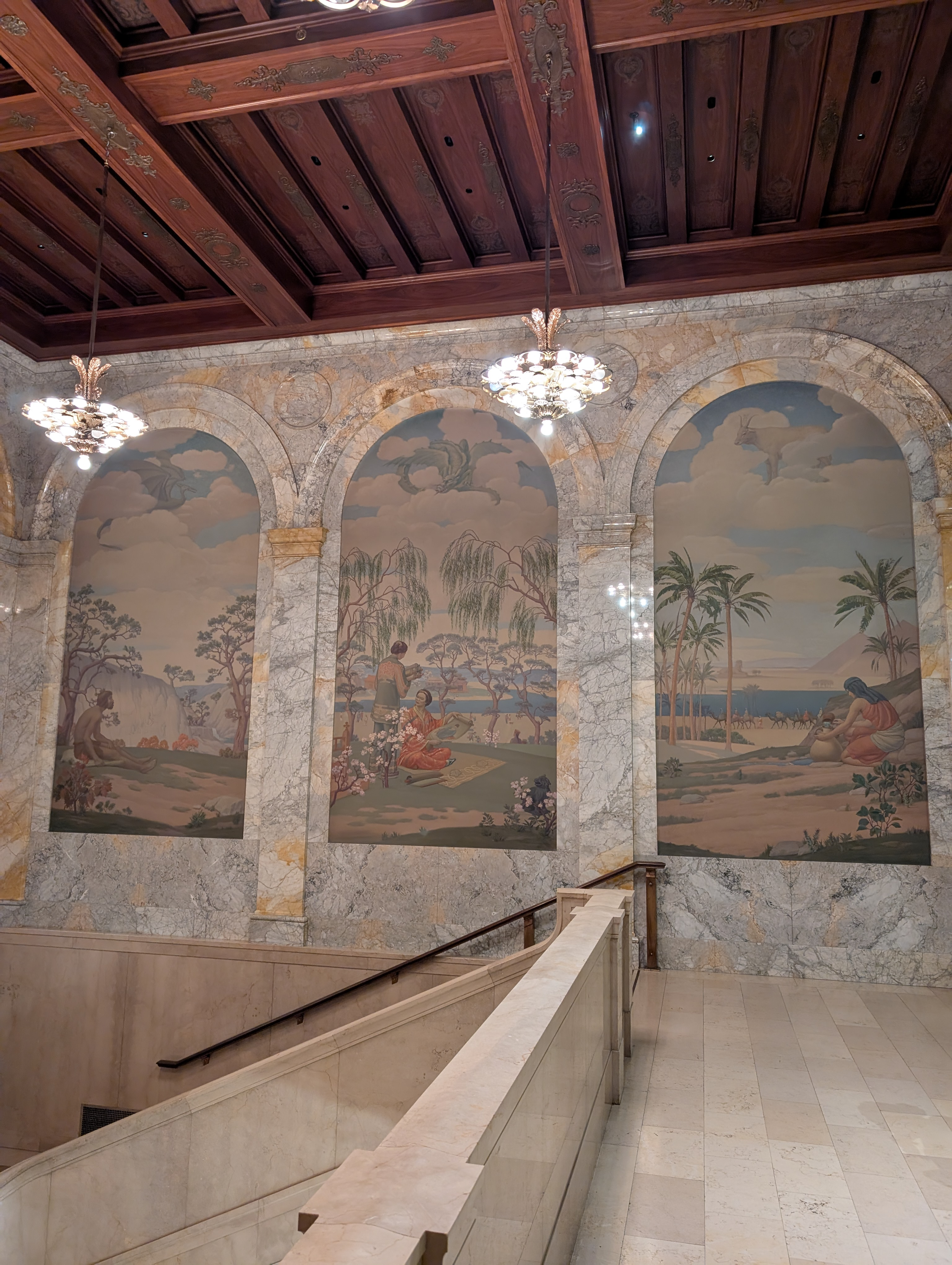
Atkins stairwell in the Nelson-Atkins Museum of Art with murals by Andrew T. Schwartz, 1931, illustrating from left to right Primitive Art, Chinese Art, Egyptian Art.

In 1931, Schwartz was commissioned by the architects Wight and Wight to create murals for the Nelson-Atkins Museum of Art in the Atkins stairway. The architects and Schwartz were inspired by the Pierre Puvis de Chavannes gallery and stairway at the Boston Public Library. Schwartz's murals represent, from the north wall moving left to right: Primitive Art, Chinese Art, Egyptian Art, Truth; from the south wall moving left to right: Beauty, Greek Art, Roman Art, Renaissance Art; and from the east wall moving left to right: Byzantine Art, The Genius of Art, and Gothic Art.

He received a Rome Prize scholarship in Visual Arts from the American Academy in Rome in 1902.

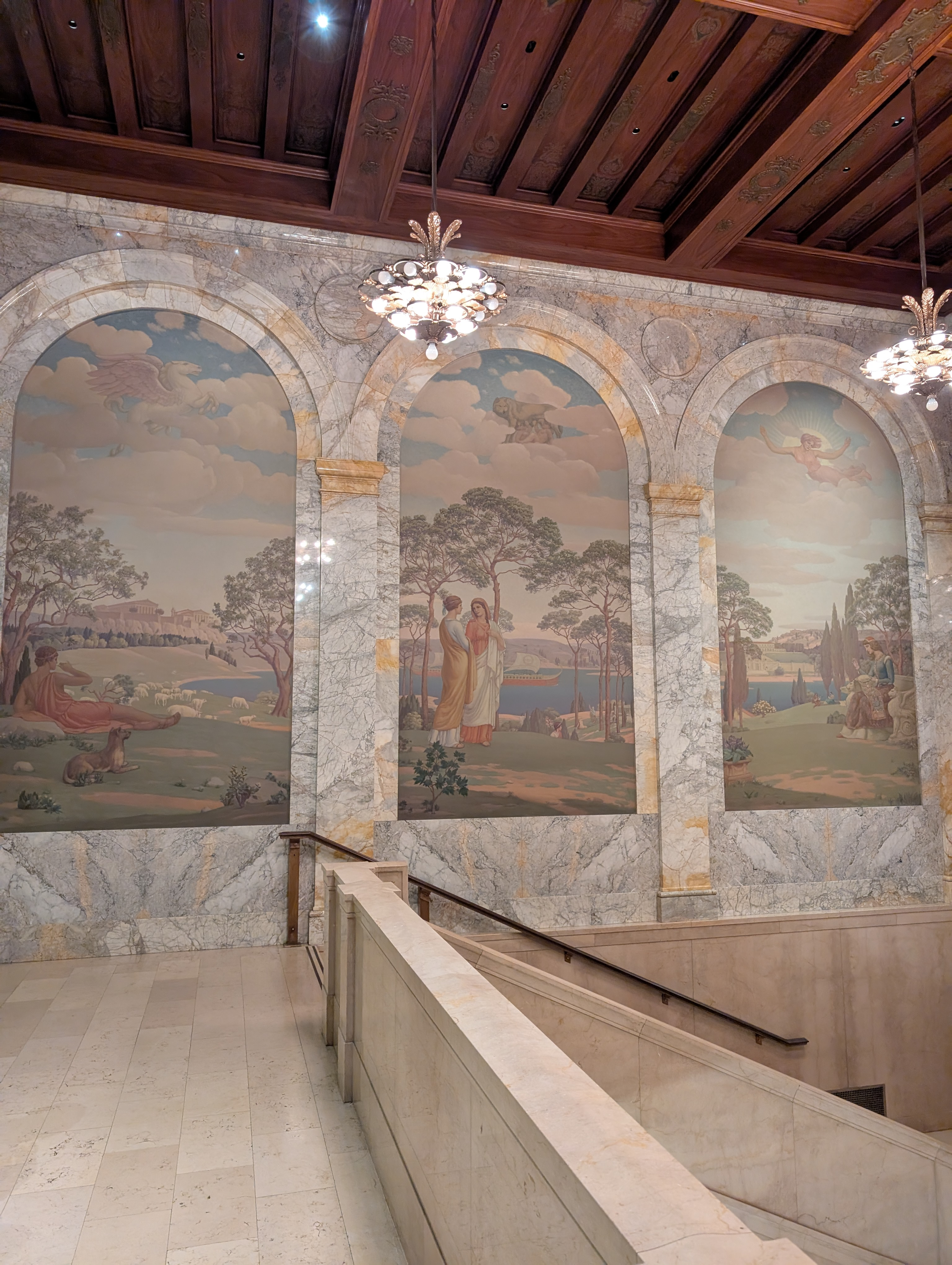
Atkins stairwell in the Nelson-Atkins Museum of Art with murals by Andrew T. Schwartz, 1931, illustrating from left to right Greek Art, Roman Art, and Renaissance Art.
