= American Society of Landscape Architects Medal =

- Awarded for: Lifetime achievements and contributions to the field of landscape architecture that have had a unique and lasting impacts on the welfare of the public and the environment.
- Sponsored by: American Society of Landscape Architects
- Location: Washington, D.C.
- Country: United States
- Reward: Medal
- First award: 1971
- Currently held by: Carol Franklin
- Website: www.asla.org/awards-events-main-landing/honors-awards/honors/the-asla-medal

The American Society of Landscape Architects Medal is awarded annually by the American Society of Landscape Architects (ASLA) to one landscape architect whose lifetime achievements and contributions to the profession have had a unique and lasting impact on the welfare of the public and the environment. It is the highest award given by the ASLA.

== History ==
The honor has been given each year since 1971. Only three winners were not ASLA fellows: Sylvia Crowe, Geoffrey Jellicoe, and Norman Newton.

== List of winners ==
- 2025 - Michael Van Valkenburgh
- 2024 - Perry Howard
- 2023 - Patricia O'Donnell
- 2022 - Shawn Kelly
- 2021 - Darwina Neal
- 2020 - Anne Whiston Spirn
- 2019 - Carol Franklin
- 2018 - Linda Jewell
- 2017 - Charles Birnbaum
- 2016 - Kurt Culbertson
- 2015 - M. Paul Friedberg
- 2014 - Richard Bell
- 2013 - Warren T. Byrd Jr.
- 2012 - Cornelia Oberlander
- 2011 - Laurie Olin
- 2010 - Edward L. Daugherty
- 2009 - Joseph E. Brown
- 2008 - Joe A. Porter
- 2007 - William B. Callaway
- 2006 - Cameron R. Man
- 2005 - Jane Silverstein Ries
- 2004 - Peter Walker
- 2003 - Richard Haag
- 2002 - Morgan Evans
- 2001 - Robert E. Marvin
- 2000 - Carl D. Johnson
- 1999 - Stuart O. Dawson
- 1998 - Carol R. Johnson
- 1997 - Julius G. Fabos
- 1996 - John T. Lyle
- 1995 - Ervin H. Zube
- 1994 - Edward Durell Stone, Jr.
- 1993 - Arthur Edwin Bye
- 1992 - Robert S. Reich
- 1991 - Meade Palmer
- 1990 - Raymond L. Freeman
- 1989 - Robert Royston
- 1988 - Sylvia Crowe
- 1987 - Philip H. Lewis Jr.
- 1986 - William J. Johnson
- 1985 - Roberto Burle Marx
- 1984 - Ian McHarg
- 1983 - Theodore O. Osmundson
- 1982 - Charles W. Eliot II
- 1981 - Geoffrey Jellicoe
- 1980 - William G. Swain
- 1979 - Norman Newton
- 1978 - Lawrence Halprin
- 1977 - Hubert Bond Owens
- 1976 - Thomas Church
- 1975 - Garrett Eckbo
- 1974 - Campbell E. Miller
- 1973 - John O. Simonds
- 1972 - Conrad L. Wirth
- 1971 - Hideo Sasaki

== See also ==
- List of lifetime achievement awards
