= Texas Triangle =

Region of Texas that contains the state's five largest cities

Coordinates: 31°N 97°W

Texas Triangle Megaregion
- Megaregion of the U.S.
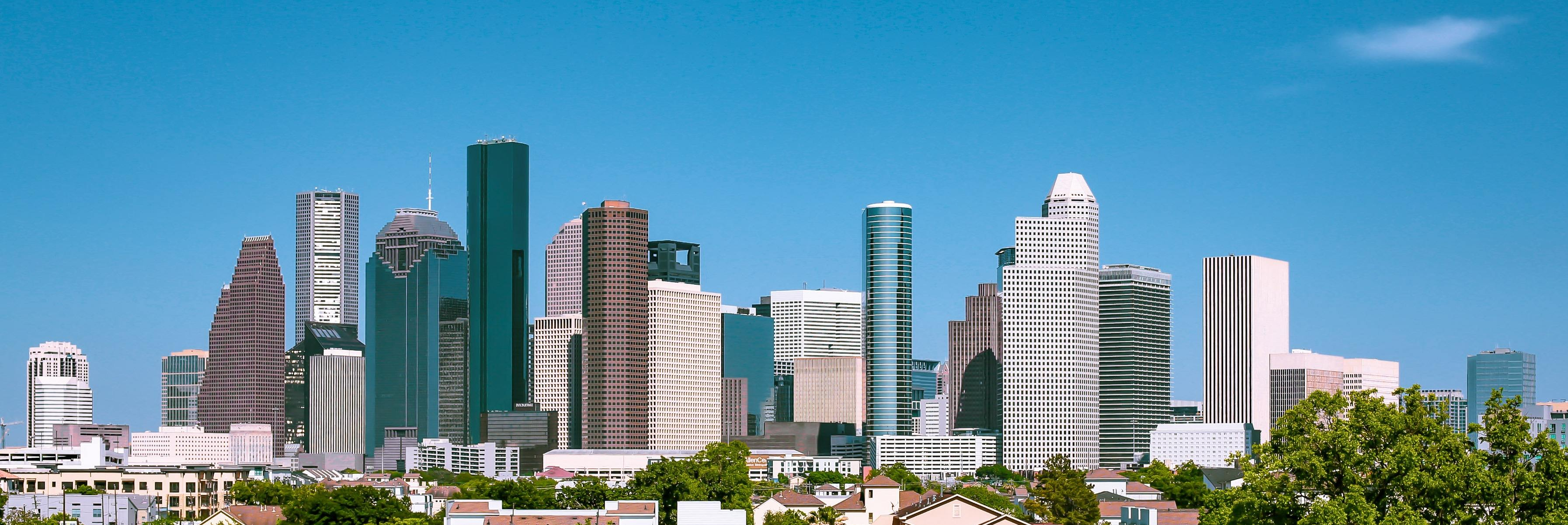
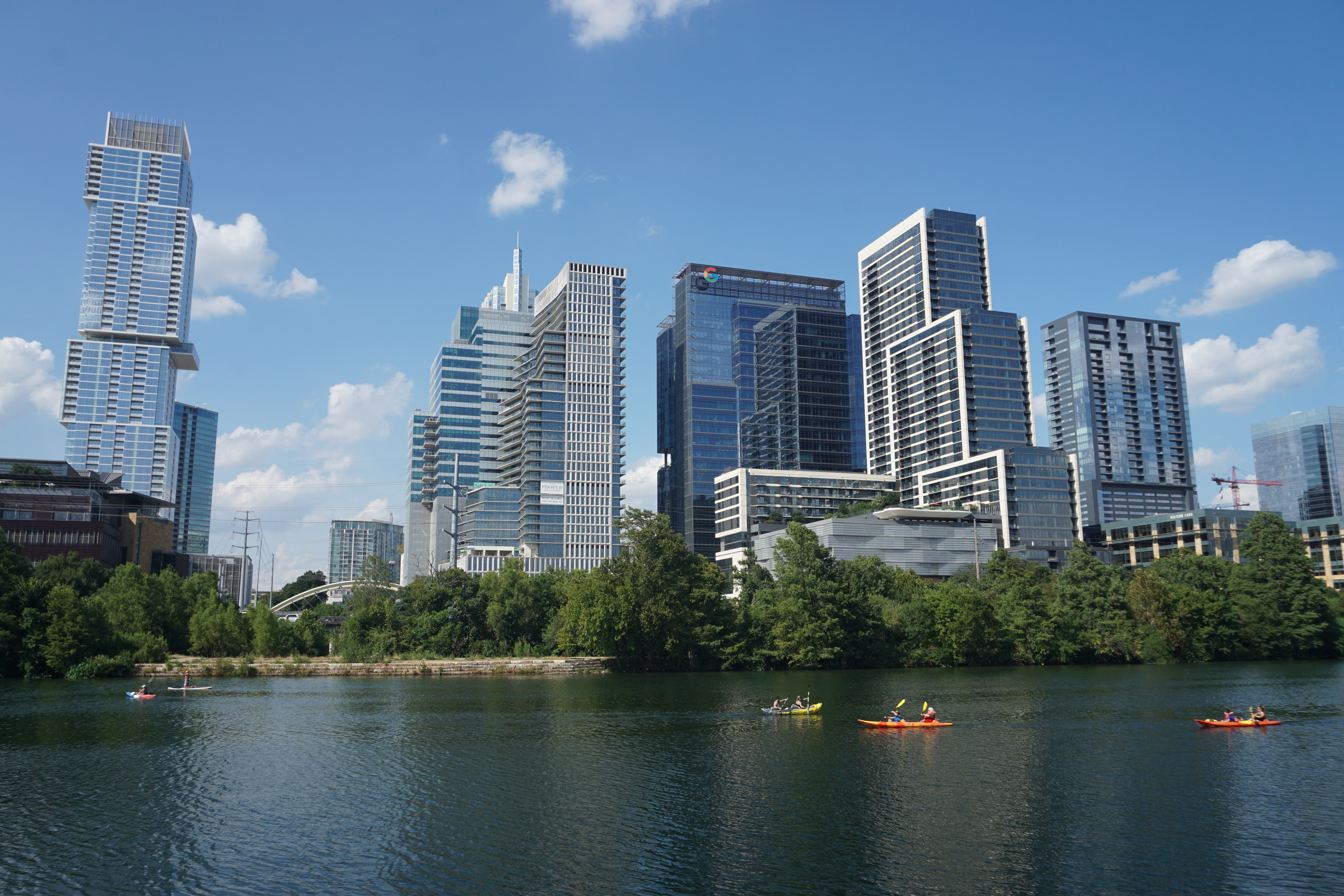
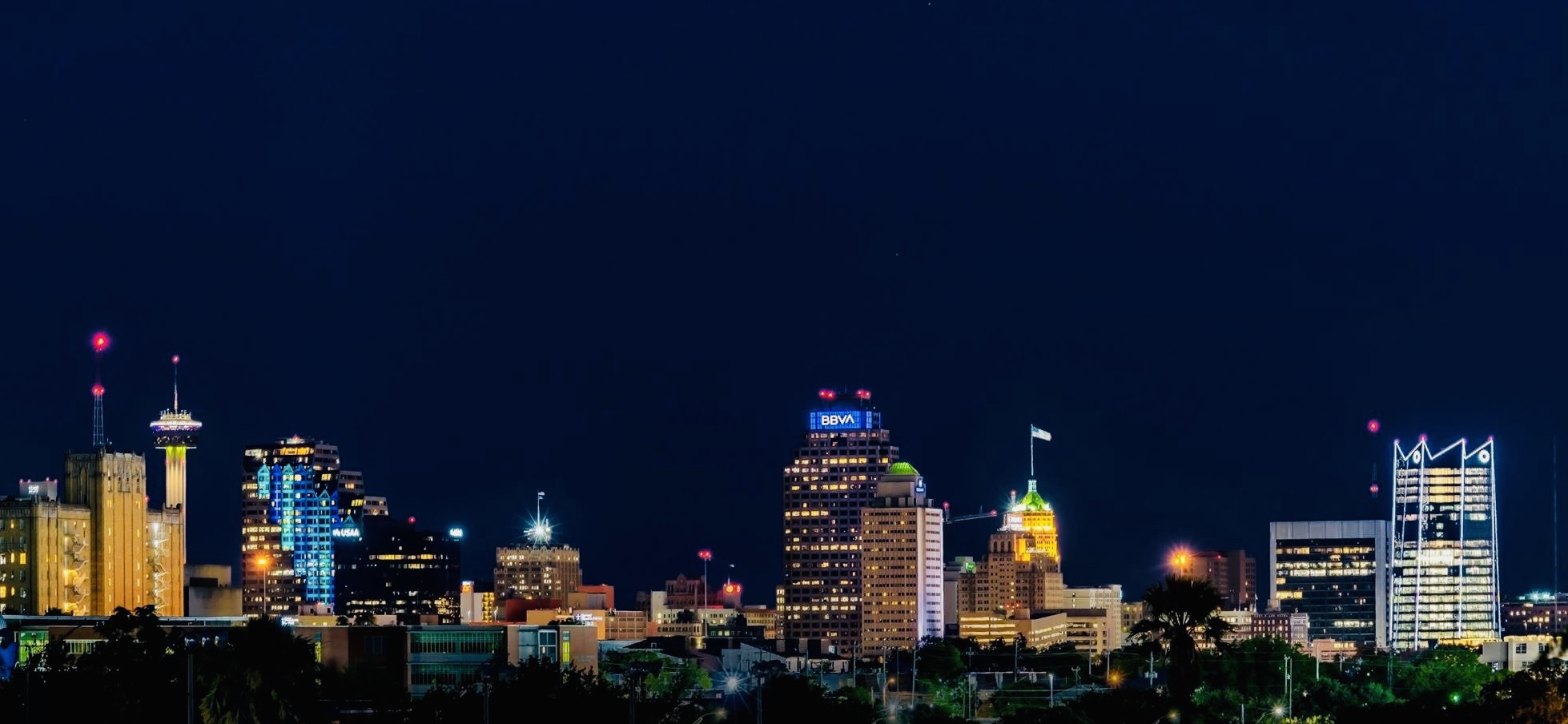
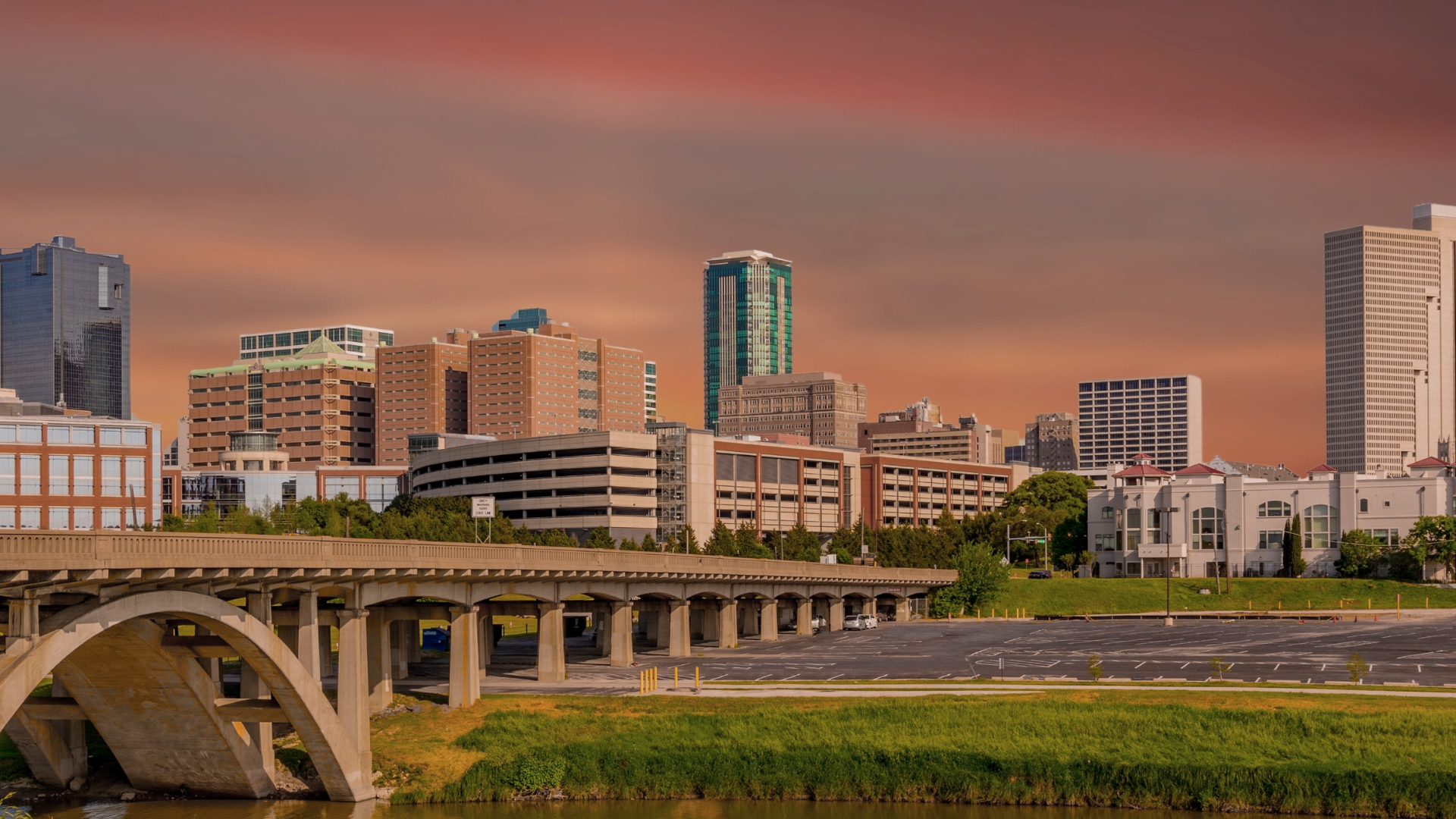
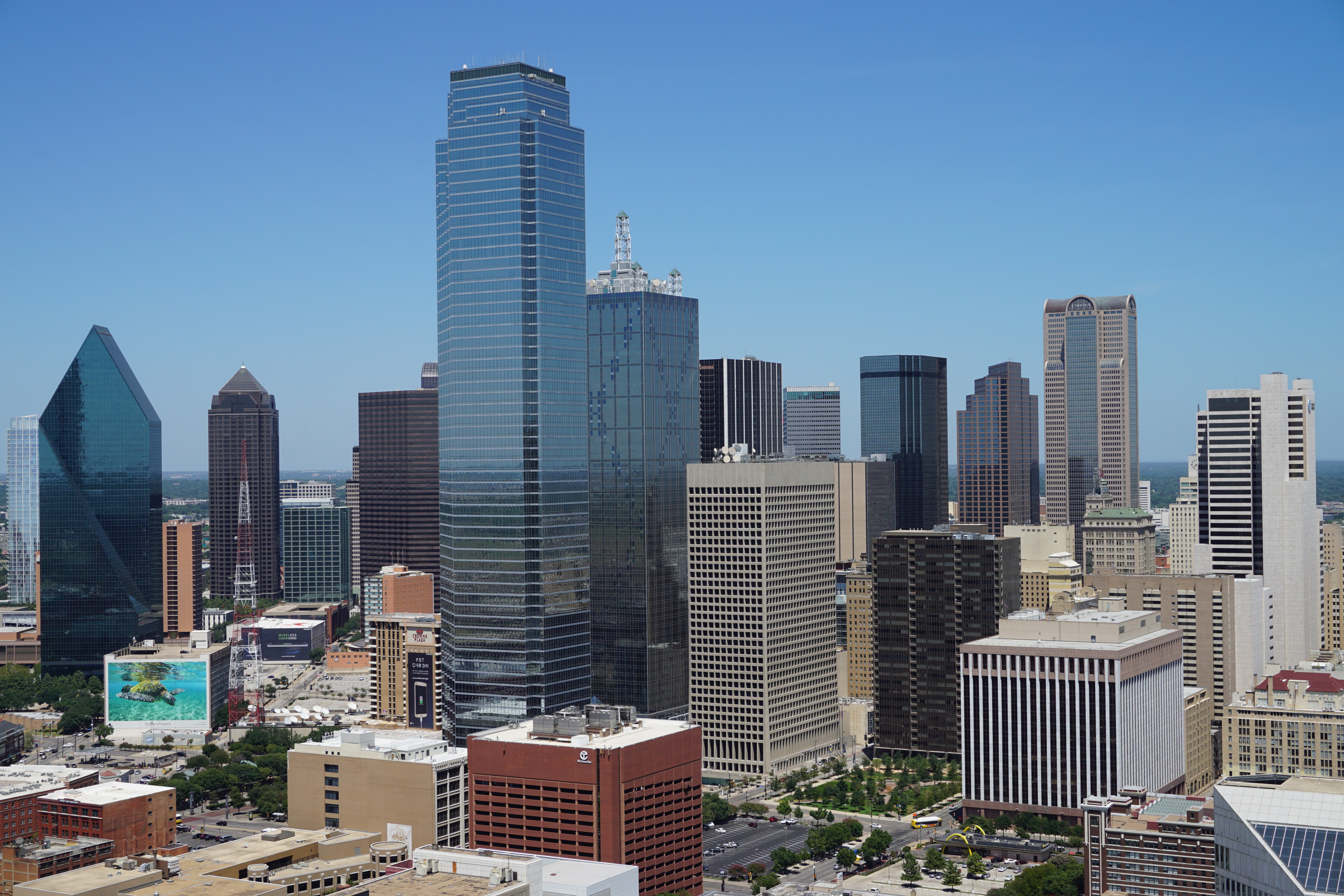
- Clockwise from top: Houston, Austin, San Antonio, Dallas, Fort Worth

- The cities and counties in or near the Texas Triangle, a megaregion of the U.S. state of Texas: City names in bold in the map legend are in the top 10 most populous Texas cities.
- Country: United States
- State: Texas

Area
  - Metro: 62,000 sq mi (160,000 km^{2})

Population
  - Estimate (2025): 22,550,219
  - Metro density: 340/sq mi (130/km^{2})

GDP
  - Metro: $2.0 trillion (2025)

The Texas Triangle is a region of Texas that contains the state's five largest cities and is home to over half of the state's population. The Texas Triangle is formed by the state's four main urban centers, Austin, Dallas-Fort Worth, Houston, and San Antonio, connected by Interstate 45, Interstate 10, and Interstate 35. The Texas Triangle is one of eleven megaregions in the United States, clusters of urban areas that share economic and cultural ties.

In 2004, the Texas Triangle contained five of the 20 largest cities in the U.S. and was home to over 70% of all Texans, with a population of 13.8 million. In 2025, its population reached nearly 23 million, following rapid growth across much of Texas. In 2009, Kent Butler and Fritz Steiner projected that, by the mid-21st century, its population was expected to increase by around two-thirds, or 10 million people, comprising nearly 80% of all Texans.

Additional metropolitan areas in the region include Bryan–College Station, Killeen–Temple–Fort Hood, and Waco. Twelve micropolitan statistical areas are within the Triangle, which includes 66 counties. Beaumont, located east of Houston, has been considered part of the Texas Triangle by numerous studies dating from 2000. Burleson County is the center of the Texas Triangle.

In 2020, The US Census announced San Antonio was the largest Latino-Hispanic populated City in the Triangle. Also in 2020, the Census announced that Fort Bend County, in the Triangle, had the largest ethnic Asian people population for all of Texas, making for 22.2 percent of the County's total residents.

== Geography ==
In his 1969 work Imperial Texas, cultural geographer Donald W. Meinig was the first to suggest that a triangular area bounded by the state's major metropolitan areas formed the "core" of the state. Meining, however, considered this region a "hollow" core unlikely to coalesce into a true megalopolis. The contemporary megaregion is defined in work by America 2050 initiative and others. Dr. Robert Lang of the Metropolitan Institute at Virginia Tech characterized Dallas–Fort Worth as one of the earliest recognized megapolitans. Although each city is distinct, Dallas and Fort Worth developed closely enough to form the urban area widely known as the Metroplex.

The 60,000-square-mile (160,000 km^{2}) region contains most of the state's largest cities and metropolitan areas, and in 2008 had a total of 17 million people and by 2020 had grown to nearly 21 million, nearly 75% of Texas's total population. The region is comparable to Florida in population and comparable to Georgia in area, but the Texas Triangle comprises less than a quarter of Texas's total land area. The Texas Department of Transportation treats the Texas Triangle as a multimodal megaregion centered on Dallas–Fort Worth, Houston, San Antonio, and Austin, with intermediate communities including Waco, Temple, and Bryan–College Station. TxDOT is developing a Texas Triangle Multimodal Strategic Plan to evaluate the movement of people and freight across the region and its connections to major trade gateways. The agency estimates that the megaregion is home to more than 22 million residents and accounts for nearly 80 percent of Texas's gross domestic product.

According to the University of Texas at Austin Center for Sustainable Development, "the Texas Triangle has three sides measuring 271, 198, and 241 miles in ground distance."

=== Metropolitan areas ===
- Austin–Round Rock–San Marcos metropolitan statistical area
- Beaumont–Port Arthur metropolitan statistical area
- Bryan–College Station metropolitan statistical area
- Dallas–Fort Worth–Arlington metropolitan statistical area
- Killeen–Temple (also incl.–Fort Hood) metropolitan statistical area
- Houston–Pasadena–The Woodlands metropolitan statistical area
- San Antonio–New Braunfels metropolitan statistical area
- Sherman–Denison metropolitan area
- Waco metropolitan statistical area

=== Micropolitan areas ===
- Brenham Micropolitan Statistical Area
- Corsicana Micropolitan Statistical Area
- Huntsville Micropolitan Statistical Area

=== Triangle counties ===
The Texas Triangle contains 65 counties. They are Anderson, Atascosa, Austin, Bandera, Bastrop, Bell, Bexar, Blanco, Bosque, Brazoria, Brazos, Burleson, Burnet, Caldwell, Chambers, Collin, Colorado, Comal, Coryell, Dallas, Denton, DeWitt, Ellis, Falls, Fayette, Fort Bend, Freestone, Galveston, Gonzales, Grimes, Guadalupe, Harris, Hays, Henderson, Hill, Hunt, Houston, Jackson, Johnson, Kaufman, Kendall, Lampasas, Lavaca, Lee, Leon, Liberty, Limestone, Madison, McLennan, Medina, Milam, Montgomery, Navarro, Rockwall, Robertson, San Jacinto, Tarrant, Travis, Trinity, Victoria, Walker, Waller, Washington, Wharton, Williamson, and Wilson.

== Politics ==
The Texas Triangle can be considered one of the more politically left-wing areas in Texas due to the anchoring cities of Houston, San Antonio, Dallas, Austin, and Fort Worth. All of these cities, and their respective counties of Harris, Bexar, Dallas, Travis, and Tarrant, moved towards Joe Biden in 2020, with Biden flipping Tarrant County, which had gone for Donald Trump in 2016. However in 2024, Trump flipped Tarrant county again, when he carried the state with a double-digit margin.

Prior to 2008, with the exception of Austin/Travis and San Antonio/Bexar (the latter a former bellwether/swing county and the former a liberal stronghold), all of these cities/counties were conservative strongholds, having voted for Republican presidential candidates from the 1960s through 2004.

This culminated with Barack Obama flipping Dallas, Harris, and Bexar counties to the Democratic party in 2008. Despite the five biggest cities in Texas being within the Triangle, there are also a great number of rural, conservative counties in the Triangle. It is in these counties that Republicans poll their best.

== Transportation ==
The Texas triangle has also been the subject of rail feasibility studies in particular for high speed rail.

== See also ==
- Conurbation
- I-35 Corridor
- Megacity
- Megalopolis
- Metropolis
- Micropolitan statistical area
- Texas statistical areas
