= Billy Fleming (landscape architect) =

American designer

Billy Fleming is an interdisciplinary scholar and practitioner of climate justice. He is an assistant professor of landscape architecture at Temple University in the Tyler School of Art and Architecture and a co-founder of the Climate and Community Institute. Fleming most recent book is Building Postcarbon Futures: Land, Justice, and Energy Transitions (Lincoln, 2026). The book is organized around an "Atlas of Postcarbon Futures" that documents 29 exemplary works of climate justice spanning 43 nations and aims to build a new set of case studies for built environment practitioners to use in their work.

Prior to Temple, Fleming founded and served as the inaugural Wilks Family Director of the Ian L. McHarg Center at the University of Pennsylvania School of Design. He is known for fusing climate justice and policy work with the landscape architecture and planning professions. He teaches, writes, lectures, and works on the intersection of climate change and the built environment, often through the policy framework known as the Green New Deal.

He was one of the key instigators and organizers of the "Green New Deal Superstudio", the Megapolitan Coastal Transformation Hub, and is a co-founder and board member for the Climate and Community Institute.

== Education ==
Fleming earned his Bachelor of Landscape Architecture from the University of Arkansas' Fay Jones School of Architecture and Design in 2011, a Master of Community and Regional Planning from the University of Texas at Austin in 2013, and a PhD in City and Regional Planning from the University of Pennsylvania in 2017.

== Career ==
He served as a policy adviser in the White House Domestic Policy Council during the Obama Administration. Fleming is also a co-author of the Indivisible Guide, a co-creator of the Data Refuge Project, and worked briefly as a landscape designer, city planner, and community organizer.

Upon completion of his Ph.D. in 2017, he became the founding Wilks Family Director of the McHarg Center, where he led a variety of public research projects, events, and coursework dedicated to the Green New Deal and its role in bringing climate justice into the design professions. Fleming also served on the editorial board for the Journal of Architectural Education, which is the flagship, peer-reivewed journal of the American Collegiate Schools of Architecture. Along with Rania Ghosn, his work there includes a special issue of the journal titled "Worlding. Energy. Transitions."

In 2018, he became a Senior Fellow with Data for Progress where he contributed to the publication of low-carbon public housing policy briefs tied to the “Green New Deal for Public Housing Act” introduced in 2019 by Rep. Alexandria Ocasio-Cortez and Senator Bernie Sanders. In 2019, he worked with Frederick Steiner, Richard Weller, and Karen M'Closkey to organize Design With Nature Now to celebrate the 50th anniversary of Ian McHarg's book Design With Nature. The celebration involved a conference, three exhibitions, a book, and a special issue of the journal Socio-Ecological Practice Research. In 2020, his studio teaching won the Award of Excellence in Student Collaboration from the American Society of Landscape Architects. The studio's work served as the template for the Green New Deal Superstudio collaboration between ASLA, the Landscape Architecture Foundation, the McHarg Center, Columbia, and the Council of Educators in Landscape Architecture. In 2021, he partnered with Daniel Aldana Cohen to create the Climate and Community Institute, an ecosocialist think-tank dedicated to connecting progressive policy-makers, leaders of the climate and housing justice movements, and leading scholars to develop new research and legislation aimed at tackling the polycrisis. In 2024, his studio won an Honor Award in Student Community from the American Society of Landscape Architects for their work in South Greenland.

In 2025, Fleming joined the Tyler School faculty at Temple University.

== Selected publications ==
- Building Postcarbon Futures: Land, Justice, and Energy Transitions
- Design With Nature Now (with Frederick Steiner, Richard Weller, and Karen M'Closkey, 2019)
- A Blueprint for Coastal Adaptation: Uniting Design, Economics, and Policy (with Carolyn Kousky and Alan Berger, 2021)
- "Design and the Green New Deal," Places Journal
- "To Rebuild Our Towns and Cities, We Need to Design a Green Stimulus," Jacobin Magazine
- "The Dutch Can't Save Us From Sea-Level Rise," CityLab
- "An Atlas for the Green New Deal," via the McHarg Center
- "A Stimulus Plan for the Planet," Los Angeles Review of Books
- "Crises and Contestations: The Promise and Peril of Designing a Green New Deal," Architectural Design
- "Frames and Fictions: Designing a Green New Deal Studio Sequence," Journal of Architectural Education
- "Hell on a Hill: Un/Building the Coalfield to Prison Pipeline," in Technical Lands: A Critical Primer
- "Red Design and the Green New Deal," Social Text
- "Field Notes Toward an Internationalist Green New Deal," via the McHarg Center
- "Landscape Frontiers: Designing within the New Geographies of the Climate Crisis," in Representing Landscapes: Visualizing Climate Action
- "Energetic Imaginaries: Extraction and Sovereignty in South Greenland," Log
- "(Un)Making Worlds" in the Journal of Architectural Education
- "In Conversation with Brett Story, Emily Kassie, and Julian Brave NoiseCat" in the Journal of Architectural Education
- "In Conversation with Amy Stelly and Virginia Hanusik" in the Journal of Architectural Education
- "Portals and Instruments" in Virginia Hanusik's Into the Quiet and the Light
