= Ian McHarg =

Scottish landscape architect (1920–2001)

- McHarg in 1969
- Born: 20 November 1920; Clydebank, Scotland
- Died: 5 March 2001 (aged 80)
- Education: Harvard University
- Occupation: Architect
- Awards: Japan Prize (2000)

Ian L. McHarg (20 November 1920 – 5 March 2001) was a Scottish landscape architect and writer on regional planning using natural systems. McHarg was one of the most influential persons in the environmental movement who brought environmental concerns into broad public awareness and ecological planning methods into the mainstream of landscape architecture, city planning and public policy.

He was the founder of the department of landscape architecture at the University of Pennsylvania in the United States. His 1969 book Design with Nature pioneered the concept of ecological planning. It continues to be one of the most widely celebrated books on landscape architecture and land-use planning. In this book, he also set forth the basic concepts that were to develop later in geographic information systems.

== Biography ==
=== Formative years ===
His father was a manager and later a salesman in the industrial city of Glasgow, Scotland. McHarg showed an early talent for drawing and was advised to consider a career in landscape architecture. His early experiences with the bifurcated landscapes of Scotland—the smoky industrial urbanism of Glasgow and the sublimity of the surrounding environs—had a profound influence on his later thinking.

It was not until after his term in the Parachute Regiment, serving in war-stricken Italy during World War II, however, that he was able to explore the field of urban landscape architecture. After working with the Royal Engineers during World War II, he travelled to America. He was admitted to the school of architecture at Harvard University's Graduate School of Design where he received professional degrees in both landscape architecture and city planning in 1949. After completing his education he returned to his homeland, intending to help rebuild a country ravaged by war. In Scotland he worked on housing and programs in "new towns", until he was contacted by Dean G. Holmes Perkins from the University of Pennsylvania. Dean Perkins wanted McHarg to build a new graduate program in landscape architecture at the university.

Soon thereafter, McHarg began teaching at the University of Pennsylvania, where he developed the department of landscape architecture, and developed a popular new course, titled Man and Environment in 1957. The course featured leading scholars whom McHarg invited to his class to discuss ethics and values, as well as other ideas ranging from entropy to plate tectonics. In 1960, he hosted his own television show on CBS, The House We Live In, inviting prominent theologians and scientists of the day to discuss the human place in the world, in a style similar to the one he honed teaching "Man and Environment."

In 1963 Ian McHarg and David A. Wallace, his academic colleague from the University of Pennsylvania, founded the firm of Wallace and McHarg Associates, later Wallace McHarg Roberts & Todd (WMRT) which is known for its central role in the development of the American environmental planning and urbanism movements. The seminal work of the firm includes the plan for Baltimore's Inner Harbor, the Plan for the Valleys in Baltimore County, MD, and the Plan for Lower Manhattan in New York City from 1963 through 1965.

As the first-wave American environmental movement swept across American college campuses in the 1960s and early 1970s, McHarg became an important figure, linking a compelling personal presence and a powerful rhetoric with a direct and persuasive proposal for a new integration of human and natural environments. Through the 1960s and 1970s, his course was the most popular on the Penn campus, and he was often invited to speak on campuses throughout the country.

=== Design with Nature ===
In 1969, he published Design with Nature, which was essentially a book of step-by-step instructions on how to break down a region into its appropriate uses. McHarg also was interested in garden design and believed that homes should be planned and designed with good private garden space. He promoted an ecological view, in which the designer becomes very familiar with the area through analysis of soil, climate, hydrology, etc. Design With Nature was the first work of its kind "to define the problems of modern development and present a methodology or process prescribing compatible solutions". The book also affected a variety of fields and ideas. Frederick R. Steiner tells us that "environmental impact assessment, new community development, coastal zone management, brownfields restoration, zoo design, river corridor planning, and ideas about sustainability and regenerative design all display the influence of Design with Nature".

Design with Nature had its roots in much earlier landscape architecture philosophies. It was sharply critical of the French Baroque style of garden design, which McHarg saw as a subjugation of nature, and full of praise for the English picturesque style of garden design. McHarg's focus, however, was only partially on the visual and sensual qualities which had dominated the English picturesque movement. Instead, he saw the earlier tradition as a precursor of his philosophy, which was rooted less in aristocratic estate design or even garden design and more broadly in an ecological sensibility that accepted the interwoven worlds of the human and the natural, and sought to more fully and intelligently design human environments in concert with the conditions of setting, climate and environment. Always a polemicist, McHarg set his thinking in radical opposition to what he argued was the arrogant and destructive heritage of urban-industrial modernity, a style he described as "Dominate and Destroy."

== Environmentally-based master plans ==
Following the publication of Design with Nature, Wallace McHarg Roberts & Todd (WMRT) worked in major American cities – Minneapolis, Denver, Miami, New Orleans, and Washington (DC) – and created environmentally-based master plans for Amelia Island Plantation and Sanibel Islands in Florida.

McHarg is credited as pioneer of ecological planning, which was introduced into landscape architecture. He implemented methods to ensure that social and environmental KPIs are part of development decisions. These methods included spatial mapping.

=== Later career ===
In 1971 McHarg delivered a speech at the North American Wildlife and Natural Resources Conference in Portland, Oregon, called "Man: Planetary Disease". In the speech he asserted that, due to the views of man and nature that have infiltrated all of western culture, people are not guaranteed survival. Of man, McHarg said, "He treats the world as a storehouse existing for his delectation; he plunders, rapes, poisons, and kills this living system, the biosphere, in ignorance of its workings and its fundamental value." To this end man is a "planetary disease", who has lived with no regard for nature. He discusses how in the Judeo-Christian traditions, the Bible says that man is to have dominion over the earth. McHarg says that for man to survive, this idea must be taken as an allegory only, and not as literally true. Lest this statement be construed as anti-religion, he cites Paul Tillich (Protestantism), Gustav Weigel (Catholicism), and Abram Heschel (Judaism) as noted religious scholars who are also in agreement with him on this point.

Ian McHarg was the original co-designer of The Woodlands, Texas, an unincorporated community in Montgomery County, Texas. This community was developed from timberland located thirty miles north of Houston, by George P. Mitchell, who hired McHarg to consult on the project and, as a result, the original plans featured many of his unique designs. Due in part to concerns of flooding, McHarg identified the water system as the most critical aspect of the site. The natural drainage system the firm designed was successful at limiting the runoff with which McHarg was concerned, and was also much cheaper than a conventional drainage system would have been. In 1998, in his collection To Heal the Earth, McHarg wrote that the Woodlands is one of the best examples of his ideals. Most of the actual work was done by a large team while McHarg was still there, and by many others in the years since he left. The Woodlands continues to be a successful ecological community even today.

McHarg's own plans for urban expansion projects also were more 'English' than 'French' in their geometry. He favoured what became known as 'cluster development' with relatively dense housing set in a larger natural environment.

In 1975, WMRT began the planning phase of a project for the Shah of Iran, an environmental park to be called Pardisan, unlike any the world had ever seen. The park was to demonstrate the heritage of the Iranian people, as well as to illustrate the major ecosystems of the world. McHarg was enthusiastic about this project, and greatly invested in the work. The other partners of the firm, however, believed the project to be a significant risk, although Iran was wealthy from the sale of oil. Their concerns became justified when the Shah was overthrown and the firm was left with a large amount of debt from the project. Located in a north western area of Tehran, Pardisan still remains as a large, relatively un-designed, green space but McHarg's designs were never implemented.

== Awards ==
McHarg was the recipient of numerous awards, including the Harvard Lifetime Achievement Award, the Pioneer Award from the American Institute of Certified Planners, and 15 medals, including the 1990 National Medal of Arts, the American Society of Landscape Architects Medal, and the Thomas Jefferson Foundation Medal in Architecture from the University of Virginia. In 1992, he received the Neutra Medal for Professional Excellence from the California State Polytechnic University, Pomona. In 2000, he received the Japan Prize in city planning, which is presented to scientists or researchers who have made a substantial contribution to the advancement of those fields.

McHarg also received an honorary doctorate from Heriot-Watt University in 1992.

== Legacy ==
In 1980 McHarg left the firm he founded and the firm changed its name to Wallace Roberts & Todd (WRT).

In 1996, McHarg published his autobiography A Quest for Life. He was also instrumental in the founding of Earth Week, and participated on task forces on environmental issues for the Kennedy, Johnson, Nixon, and Carter administrations

The Ian McHarg Medal, named after him, is awarded by the Earth and Space Science Informatics Division of the European Geosciences Union for research in information technology applied to Earth and space sciences.

McHarg died on 5 March 2001 at the age of eighty from pulmonary disease.

== Ian L. McHarg Center for Urbanism and Ecology ==
In the summer of 2017, the University of Pennsylvania Stuart Weitzman School of Design launched a new, interdisciplinary research center in McHarg's honor. Anticipating the 50th publication anniversary of his text Design with Nature, the McHarg Center's public launch took place in June 2019 as a part of an event, exhibition, and book project known as "Design with Nature Now". Its mission is to build on The Weitzman School's position as a global leader in urban ecological design by bringing environmental and social scientists together with planners, designers, policy-makers, and communities to develop practical, innovative ways of improving the quality of life in the places most vulnerable to the effects of climate change.

The center is led by co-Executive Directors Frederick Steiner and Richard Weller. Its founding Wilks Family Director is Billy Fleming.

== Books ==
- To Heal the Earth: Selected Writings of Ian L. McHarg 1998 ISBN 1-55963-573-8
- A Quest for Life: An Autobiography Ian L. McHarg 1996 ISBN 0-471-08628-2
- Design with Nature Ian L. McHarg 1969 ISBN 0-471-11460-X
- Ian McHarg: Dwelling in Nature: Conversations with Students 2007 ISBN 1-56898-620-3
- The Essential Ian McHarg: Writings on Design and Nature Frederick Steiner 2006 ISBN 1-59726-117-3

== See also ==
- Garden real estate
- History of gardening
- Landscape ecology
- Land Ethic
- Loren Eiseley
- Ecology
