= Design Workshop =

International architecture firm

Design Workshop is an international landscape architecture, land planning, urban design and strategic services firm that began in 1969. The firm was named ASLA's Firm of the Year in 2008 for its work in new communities, urban centers, resorts, public parks, golf courses and residences.

The firm has offices in the United States in Austin, Aspen, Denver, Houston, Lake Tahoe, Raleigh, and Los Angeles.

Design Worksop has collaborated with Utah State University to be offer a collection of its project records for use by students, landscape architects, environmental planners and anyone studying the history and development of the 20th-Century West.

== History ==
Design Workshop was founded in 1969 by Don Ensign and Joe A. Porter - friends and college professors. They assisted private-sector clients, often engaging colleagues and students in a collaborative process they labeled “design workshops.”

Their early assignments started their small professional practice. A few years later the founders relocated the firm to Aspen and became known for solving the complex problems found in fragile ecosystems and the development challenges of the western landscape.

Over 55 years later, Design Workshop's services have expanded to include master plans for counties, planned communities, urban centers and resorts as well as design for public parks, residences and roadways.

== Notable projects ==
Some of Design Workshop's projects include:

- Aspen Downtown Enhancement and Pedestrian Plan - Aspen, Colorado
- Daybreak Community - South Jordan, Utah
- The Glacier Club at Tamarron - Durango, Colorado
- Kananaskis Village - Alberta, Canada
- Kierland Commons - Phoenix, Arizona
- Rancho Viejo - Santa Fe, New Mexico
- Riverfront Park - Denver, Colorado
- Whistler Blackcomb - Whistler, British Columbia, Canada
- Whistler Comprehensive Sustainability Plan - Whistler, British Columbia
