= Morgan "Bill" Evans =

Morgan "Bill" Evans (June 10, 1910 – August 16, 2002) was a horticulturalist who guided the landscape design of Disney theme parks for half a century. He most notably transformed the landscape of 80 acres (320,000 m^{2}) of forest in Anaheim, California to create Disneyland.

== Early life ==
Evans was born in Santa Monica, California, where he learned botany from his father, a second-generation horticulturalist. He joined the Merchant Marine in 1928 and traveled around the world on the SS President Harrison, gathering seeds for his father's garden from the countries he visited.

After returning from duty, Evans studied at Pasadena City College and then at Stanford, majoring in geology. He left school early in 1931 because of the Great Depression, and returned home to transform his father's garden into a nursery business selling rare and exotic plants to the Hollywood elite. One of his customers was Walt Disney, who asked Evans to landscape the grounds of his Holmby Hills home and surrounding gardens. Disney was impressed by Evan's skill and invited Evans and his brother, Jack, to landscape what would become Disneyland.

== Landscaping Disneyland ==
In less than a year, Evans had transformed 80 acres (320,000 m^{2}) of Anaheim orange groves into lush theme park attractions filled with exotic plants. One of the prominent pieces of the projects was landscaping the Jungle Cruise ride along the path of an artificial river, which Disney insisted be "the best darn jungle this side of Costa Rica." This section of the park included a canopy of bamboo, palms, and ficus trees towering 70 feet (21 m) tall. To create the appearance of exotic jungle branches, Evans planted walnut trees upside down to give the appearance that their gnarled roots were branches.

== Later work with Disney ==
After Disneyland opened in July 1955, Evans stayed on with Disney as a landscape planner, consultant and maintenance supervisor at the park. Disney made him the director of landscape architecture. His projects in this capacity included working on Disneyland additions, Walt Disney World and EPCOT Center.

Evans retired from Disney in 1975, but continued his work for Disney with the landscape design of Tokyo Disneyland, Hong Kong Disneyland, Disneyland Paris and additions in Walt Disney World such as Disney's Polynesian Resort, Discovery Island, Typhoon Lagoon, Disney-MGM Studios and Disney's Animal Kingdom.

== Personal life ==
After the death of his wife Jane, Bill married Natalie Scott (who had two teenage daughters). His adult son and daughter lived in northern California. Aside from his work at Disney, Evans was also a writer for Sunset magazine, a trustee for the Los Angeles County Arboretum, and a fellow of the American Society of Landscape Architects.

== Death and legacy ==
Evans died at age 92 in Malibu, California. The cause of death was not reported.

Evans was posthumously awarded the American Society of Landscape Architects Medal in 2002 in recognition of his lifetime achievement in the profession of landscape architecture.
