= Charles W. Eliot II =

American landscape architect (1899–1993)

Charles William Eliot II
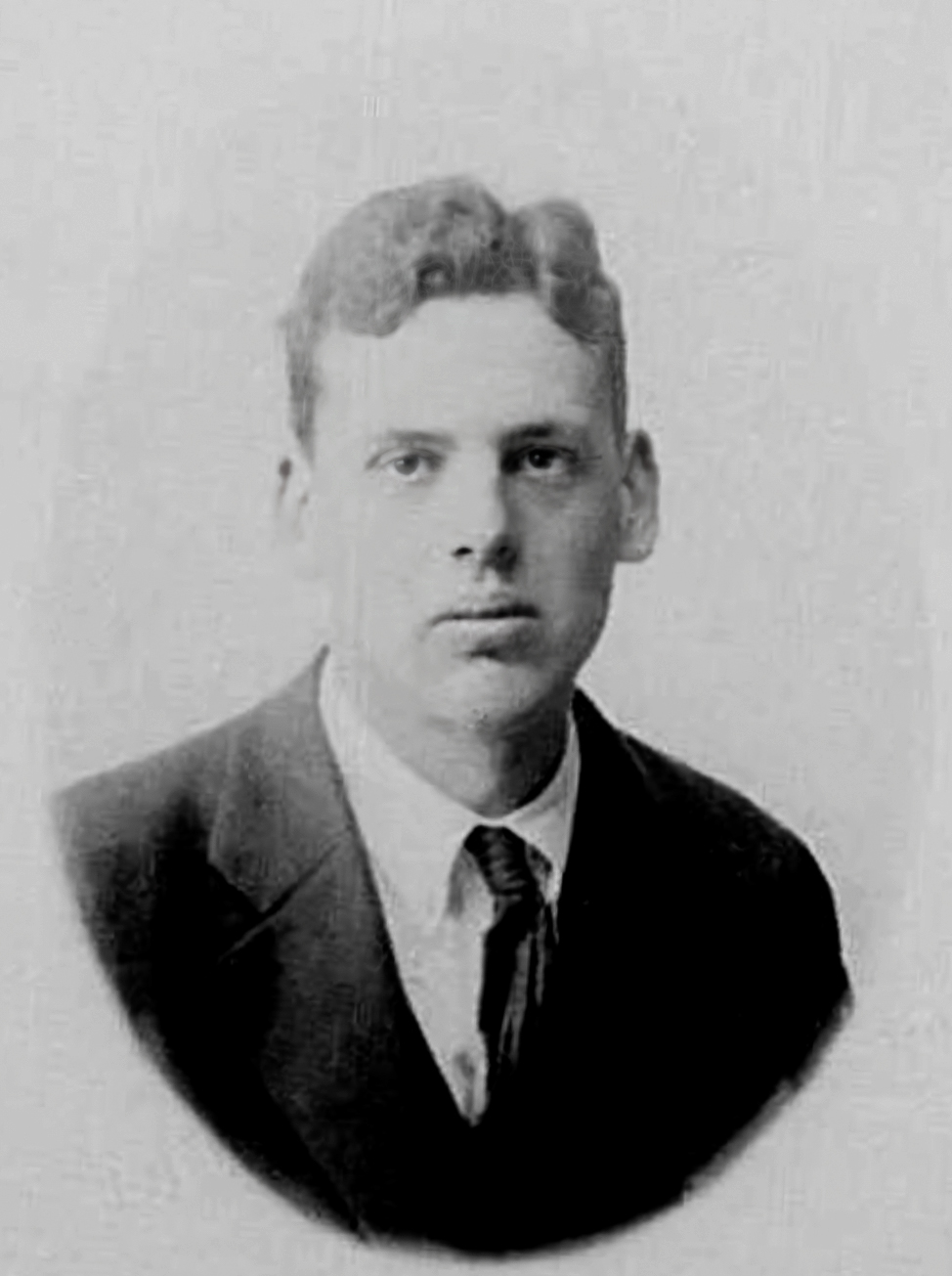
- Charles William Eliot II (1923)
- Born: November 5, 1899; Cambridge, Massachusetts
- Died: March 16, 1993 (aged 93); Cambridge, Massachusetts
- Education: Harvard University
- Occupations: Landscape architect, professor
- Parent: Samuel Atkins Eliot II
- Relatives: Charles William Eliot (grandfather); Charles Eliot (uncle)
- Family: Eliot family

Charles William Eliot II (November 5, 1899 – March 16, 1993) was a prominent American landscape architect. Eliot was son of Samuel Atkins Eliot II, a Unitarian minister, nephew of Charles Eliot, the celebrated landscape architect, and grandson of Charles W. Eliot, President of Harvard University, for whom he was named.

Eliot was born in Cambridge, Massachusetts, and educated at Harvard University. Despite leaving his studies in 1918 to join the American Red Cross as an ambulance driver in Italy, he graduated with his class in 1920 and received his master's degree in 1923 from the School of Landscape Architecture. He then apprenticed with the Olmsted Brothers, toured Europe, and on his return established his practice in Boston, serving as secretary of The Trustees of Reservations as its first paid employee. In this role, he conceived and began the process of establishing the Bay Circuit Beltway, a green belt encircling greater Boston.

In time he relocated to Washington, D.C., first as director of the National Capital Park and Planning Commission until 1933, involved in the development of the National Mall, then until 1943 as Director of the National Resources Planning Board, which formed part of the Public Works Administration. One of his most notable government projects was in planning and advocating for the George Washington Memorial Parkway along the Potomac River. As he wrote at the time, "No area in the United States combine[s] so many historical monuments in so small a district as the Potomac River Valley in the Washington region."

After a few years in Pasadena, California, he returned to Cambridge in the early 1950s as a consultant. In 1954 joined the faculty of the Harvard Graduate School of Design as Charles Eliot Professor of Landscape Architecture, where he taught until 1966, and joined the board of The Trustees of Reservations. Eliot also served as Assistant Editor of the American City Planning Institute's monthly magazine, City Planning, contributing editor for Planning and Civic Comment (1935-1943), and on various roles on the editorial board of the Journal of the American Institute of Planners (1955-1958), and the publication board of Landscape Architecture (1956-1959). He was a Fellow of the American Society of Landscape Architects (ASLA), and in 1982, was awarded its highest honor, the ASLA Medal. He died March 16, 1993, in Cambridge, Massachusetts.

== Sources ==
- Preliminary Report, PARK SYSTEM FOR THE DISTRICT OF COLUMBIA, submitted in Accordance with Program of Work adopted August, 1926, December, 1926. National Archives, Record Group 79, Box 4.
- "The George Washington Memorial Parkway," Landscape Architecture, vol. XXII, April 1932, p. 191.
- Guide to Charles W. Eliot II Papers, (1891-1993), The Trustees of Reservations, 2016.
- Charles W. Eliot II Papers, 1971-1976
- Charles W. Eliot, II, The Cultural Landscape Foundation
- Charles W. Eliot, II, Harvard Square Library
- Eliot Talks About Role of Buildings, Harvard Crimson, November 14, 1956
