= Joseph Porter =

Joseph Porter may refer to:

== Music ==
- Joe Porter (producer), record producer and songwriter
- Joseph Porter, founder of British rock group Blyth Power
- Joe Porter, former drummer of the band Jars of Clay

== Sportsmen ==
- Joey Porter (born 1977), American football player
- Joe Porter (cricketer) (born 1980), English cricketer
- Joe Porter (American football) (born 1985), American football player

== Fictional characters ==
- Sir Joseph Porter, fictional Lord of the Admiralty in H.M.S. Pinafore
- Joseph Porter, a fictional character in Hollywood Pinafore
- Mrs Joseph Porter, one of the Sketches by Boz, short stories by Charles Dickens

== Others ==
- Joseph C. Porter (1819–1863), Confederate officer in the American Civil War
- The Dr. Joseph Y. Porter House, a historic home in Key West, Florida
- Joe A. Porter, American landscape architect
