= Pardisan Park =

Urban wild park in Tehran, Iran

Coordinates: 35°44′N 51°21′E

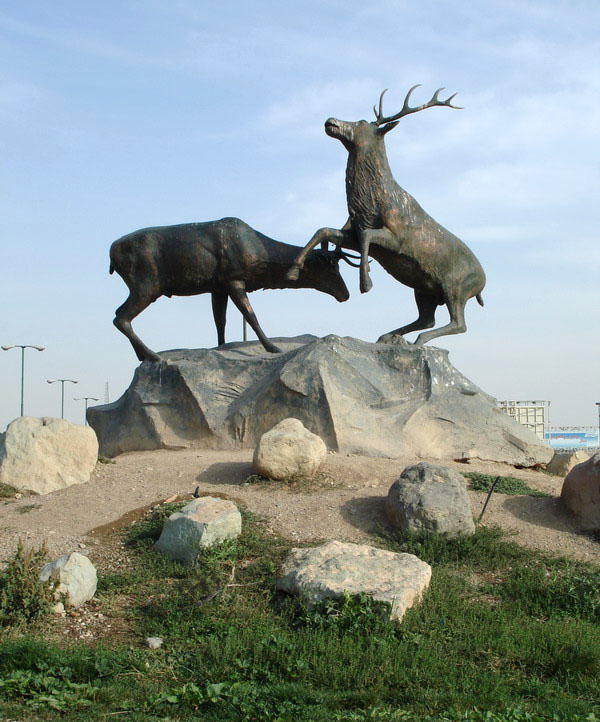
- Statue of Persian fallow deer doing a mating-dance
- Interactive map of Pardisan Park
- Type: Urban wild
- Designer: Ian McHarg
- Operator: Department of Environment
- Status: Open all year

Pardisan Park (Persian: پارک پردیسان, romanized: Pārk-e Pardisān) is a complex covering more than 270 hectares, located in the northwest of Tehran, Iran. It is connected to Hemmat Expressway in the north, and to Sheikh Nouri Expressway in the east.

== History ==
The original design of the park is attributed to Ian McHarg of the University of Pennsylvania.

The planning phase of the park was begun by Wallace McHarg Roberts & Todd in 1975, under the reign of the last Shah of Iran, Mohammad Reza Pahlavi. Due to the conflicts of the 1979 Revolution, the project was suspended, and the firm was left with a large amount of debt. The site was retained as a green space after the revolution, but the designs of Wallace McHarg Roberts & Todd were never implemented.

== Facilities ==
It is primarily an educational, research and cultural center, with the objective of environmental studies.
