= Norman Newton =

American architect

Norman T. Newton
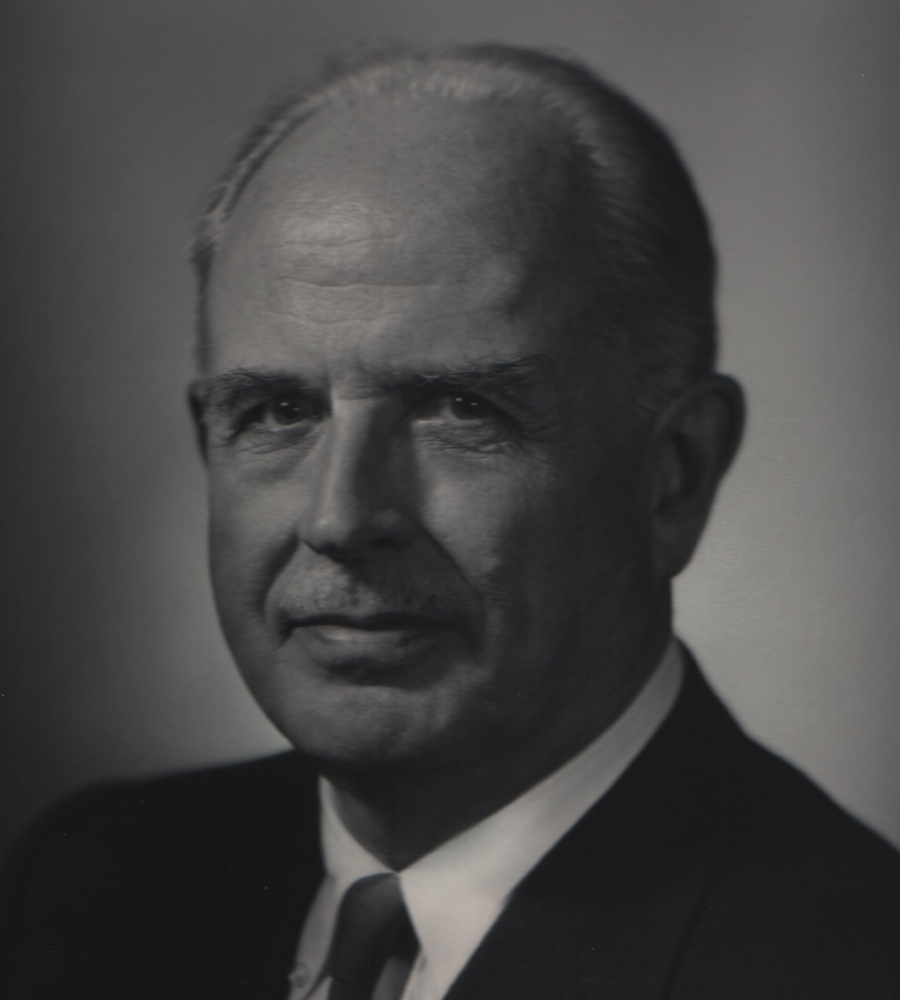
- Born: Norman Thomas Newton; April 21, 1898; Corry, Pennsylvania, United States
- Died: September 12, 1992 (aged 94); Cambridge, Massachusetts, United States
- Occupations: Landscape Architect, Author
- Spouse: Lyyli Lamsa Newton

Norman Thomas Newton (April 21, 1898 – September 12, 1992) was an American landscape architect and winner of the Prix de Rome.

== Early career ==
Born in 1898 in Corry, Pennsylvania, Newton graduated from Cornell University in 1919, receiving his master's degree in landscape design, also from Cornell, in 1920.. A winner of the Prix de Rome in 1923, he spent three years as a resident fellow at the American Academy in Rome, where he studied the gardens of Italian villas, training for his future as a landscape architect.

== Statue of Liberty ==
Returning to New York he worked for Ferruccio Vitale before establishing his own office in 1932. He sought to become involved with public-works projects under the auspices of the Civilian Conservation Corps. He was appointed resident landscape architect for the northeastern region of the National Park Service and redesigned the setting for the Statue of Liberty. His master plan for what was then called Bedloes Island called for removing Army barracks and adding lawns and walkways. His other public-works projects included master plans for the Custom House at Derby Wharf in Salem, Mass., and for Saratoga Battlefield National History Park.

== World War II ==
Netwon had served as an aviation cadet in the U.S. Marine Corps Reserve in 1918. He returned to Italy in World War II as senior monuments officer, first with the 330th Air Service Group and then attached to the British Eighth Army. He surveyed damaged architectural monuments and advised Allied officers and troops on the historical value of buildings. He instructed Italian officials as to which buildings needed immediate repairs and which could be done later.

== Later career ==
Norman joined the faculty of the Graduate School of Design at Harvard University in 1939 and, except for the war years, remained until his retirement in 1967. He was a fellow of the American Society of Landscape Architects and was its president from 1957 to 1961.

== Recognition ==
Newton held the rank of lieutenant colonel in the U.S. Army Air Force, as a Monuments, Fine Arts, and Archives (MFAA) Officer. The Italian Government gave him the title of Commander of the Order of Saints Maurice and Lazarus, Grand Officer Crown of Italy and awarded him the Star of Italian Solidarity in 1950. Newton’s work earned him the Bradford Williams Medal, the ASLA Medal and the title of Charles Eliot Professor of Landscape Architecture.

== Bibliography ==
- War Damage to Monuments and Fine Arts of Italy
- Design on the Land: The Development of Landscape Architecture
- Approach to Design
