= Wallace Roberts & Todd =

Architecture firm in Philadelphia, Pennsylvania, U.S.

WRT
- Industry: Architecture
- Founded: 1963; 63 years ago
- Headquarters: 123 S Broad St, Philadelphia, Pennsylvania
- Website: www.wrtdesign.com

WRT (Wallace Roberts & Todd, LLC, formerly known as Wallace McHarg Roberts & Todd) is an interdisciplinary urban planning, urban design, landscape architecture, and architecture firm based in Philadelphia, Pennsylvania, United States. WRT is a collaborative practice of city and regional planners, urban designers, landscape architects and architects with an additional office in San Francisco, California.

== History ==
Founded in 1963 as Wallace McHarg Roberts & Todd (WMRT) by David A. Wallace, Ian McHarg, William H. Roberts, and Thomas A. Todd, the firm had over 200 employees at its peak.

Several early projects, including the Plan for the Valleys in Maryland, the Inner Harbor in Baltimore, and the Lower Manhattan Plan in New York City, helped establish the ecological planning approach later articulated in McHarg's Design with Nature (1969), which argued for design that worked with, rather than against, existing ecological and geographic conditions. Through the 1970s, the firm applied this approach to projects including the Amelia Island and Sanibel Island master plans in Florida, a growth-management plan for New Orleans, and the planned community of The Woodlands, Texas. McHarg left the firm in 1980. In the 1980s, WRT worked on the U.S. Capitol Master Plan and the redevelopment that led to the construction of Oriole Park at Camden Yards in Baltimore, both cited as catalysts for downtown reinvestment in their respective cities.

In the 1990s the firm's work included a master plan for the 6,800-acre Neal Smith National Wildlife Refuge in Iowa and the Canal Walk redevelopment in downtown Richmond, Virginia. As sustainability entered mainstream planning discourse in the early 2000s, WRT's projects included the Anacostia Waterfront Initiative in Washington, D.C., and Philadelphia's Green City, Clean Waters program, a long-term plan for managing the city's stormwater infrastructure.

More recently, WRT has expanded into affordable and mixed-use housing and a broader architecture portfolio spanning educational and residential work.

== Design projects ==
WRT headed the design of Abuja, the new capital of Nigeria, and completed design projects for. It has done waterfront projects for the cities of Norfolk and Richmond in Virginia, as well as projects for Indianapolis, Indiana, Honolulu, and Dallas. It redesigned Kakaako Waterfront Park in Honolulu, and designed Hale Koa Hotel and Fort DeRussy Military Reservation in the Waikiki area of Honolulu. WRT has also done a study of renovating the Ocean Beach in New London County, Connecticut.

WRT is drafting architectural plans for three 400-acre (1.6 km^{2}) parks along the Floyds Fork in Louisville, Kentucky, which is believed to be the largest urban park project in the United States.

== Awards ==
In 2011, the American Planning Association named WRT as the recipient of its inaugural award, National Planning Award for Achievement in Planning, a recognition for its continual progressive and innovative planning practices. The American Association of Landscape Architects recognized WRT in 2010 with its National Award for its influential body of work. In 1996, the United States Department of Transportation and the National Endowment for the Arts gave Wallace Roberts & Todd an Honor Award for its proposed design of the Hudson-Bergen Light Rail. The competition for the award included 300 entries, and WRT was one of eleven who received the award.

In 2000, WRT received two awards from Waterfront Center for its role in planning the Hudson River Waterfront Walkway.

In 2004, WRT received an Award of Honor from the American Society of Landscape Architects for its design of parks near the Anacostia River.

In 2008, WRT received the Charter Award from Congress for the New Urbanism for its project titled "A Civic Vision for the Central Delaware".
