= William B. Callaway =

American landscape architect

William B. Callaway, FASLA (May 26, 1943 – November 25, 2014) was an American landscape architect with SWA Group, recognized for his ability to design landscapes that are timeless. Peter Walker, designer of the World Trade Center Memorial and a long-time colleague, described Callaway as being "among the icons of post-World War II practice", developing his modern style by consistently staying true to the natural character of the landscape.

== Planning and design leadership ==
Callaway established a broad landscape and urban design stamp on cities, company campuses, and civic and cultural facilities. According to the San Francisco Chronicle, notable commercial landscape design projects include Beijing Finance Street in Beijing and Ninoy Aquino International Airport Terminal in Manila. "Closer to home, Callaway has designed the corporate campus for Electronics Arts in Redwood City, the master plan for Mare Island (Solano County) and Shoreline Regional park in Mountain View." Other noted U.S. work includes Concord Pavilion and Refugio Valley Park in California, PPG Place in Pittsburgh, and Arizona Center in Phoenix.

Beijing Finance Street was honored by the Urban Land Institute with its Global Award of Excellence, one of five awarded that year, and it received the China Award from Businessweek magazine.

In 1994, he was honored as a Fellow in the American Society of Landscape Architects (ASLA). In bestowing the 2007 ASLA Medal, the organization's highest honor for an individual, the jury said his "personal leadership, charisma, and professional passion inspire designers to retain an idealistic view of the profession and the world."

Architects and developers have sought out his designs to enhance structures and the built-environment. Architect Robert Arrigoni characterizes Callaway's landscapes as those that "never seem to age and the more you look at them, the better they look and the better they make our buildings."

== Career and background ==
Callaway was the first in his family to go to college, graduating from the University of California at Berkeley in 1967 with a Bachelor of Science in Landscape Architecture. After serving in the Marine Corps, he began his design career at Sasaki Walker Associates (now SWA Group) in San Francisco. In 1969, he left Sasaki Walker to attend Harvard University's Graduate School of Design, where he received his Master of Landscape Architecture in 1971.

Upon graduation, Callaway returned to SWA Group's Sausalito headquarters, and rose to be named president in 1996, and then CEO in 2003. In 2006 he became the firm's Chairman, and remained a principal and member of the board of directors until his death.

Under his leadership as president, SWA in 2005 became the third firm in the ASLA to be awarded the Landscape Architecture Firm Award.

Callaway was born and raised in Courtland, California, on a ranch situated in the Sacramento River Delta, which his family has farmed since 1850. He is married to Barbara Meacham (1973 MLA-graduate from the University of California at Berkeley). Callaway and Meacham have two children: Catherine and Andrew. He has two children from a previous marriage: Amy and Peter, and two grandchildren.

== Notable projects ==
=== Public realm ===
- Centennial Park, Atlanta
- Barney Allis Plaza, Kansas City, Missouri
- Refugio Valley Park, Hercules, California
- PPG Place, Pittsburgh, Pennsylvania
- Village of Merrick Park, Coral Gables, Florida
- Beijing Finance Street, Beijing
- 101 California Street highrise, San Francisco
- Rainier Vista, Seattle
- Arizona Center, Phoenix, Arizona

=== Institutional ===
- Columbus City Hall, Columbus IN
- National Audio-Visual Conservation Center, Culpeper, Virginia
- Concord Pavilion, Concord, California
- McCormick Place, Chicago

=== Corporate/High tech ===
- Firemans Fund headquarters, Novato, California
- Weyerhaeuser headquarters, Federal Way, Washington
- Hewlett Packard campus, Rohnert Park, California
- IBM Almaden Research Center, San Jose, California
- Electronic Arts headquarters, Redwood City, California
- Crown Zellerbach Building, San Francisco

=== Hospitality ===
- Hyatt Gainey Ranch, Phoenix, Arizona

=== New town planning ===
- Tuen Mun New Town, Hong Kong
- Filinvest City, Manila
- Mare Island, Vallejo, California
