= David A. Wallace =

American architect

David A. Wallace FAICP, AIA, PP (1917 – July 19, 2004) was an urban planner and architect who co-founded, with Ian McHarg, the firm of Wallace Roberts & Todd (WRT).

== Early career ==
Wallace's career spanned the second half of the 20th century. Beginning in Philadelphia, Pennsylvania, in 1953, under Mayor Joseph S. Clark, Wallace led a citywide urban redevelopment evaluation that resulted in the Central Urban Renewal Area Report (CURA), which established a new strategy for overall redevelopment that targeted catalytic actions to strengthen communities and downtown. CURA became a model for several other cities, notably Baltimore, Maryland.

In 1957, Wallace moved to Baltimore and headed a team to prepare a plan for the city's ailing central business district, which had not had any major new construction projects since the end of the 1920s. Responding to the need for immediate action, the team designed the 22-acre (89,000 m^{2}) Charles Center, a 33-acre mixed-use project that started the revitalization. Approved by Baltimore City voters in a bond issue request for $25 million in the municipal elections of November 1958, the concept was strongly supported by two mayors of the city from different political parties: Democrat Thomas L. J. D'Alesandro, Jr. (1947-1959) and Republican Theodore R. McKeldin, (1943-1947 and 1963-1967), as well as business, commercial and other civic leaders in the Greater Baltimore Committee and the Baltimore Chamber of Commerce. The Charles Center was praised by Jane Jacobs in the journal Architectural Forum as the "New Heart for Downtown Baltimore", and set the stage for the subsequent Inner Harbor project, a re-development of the city's old waterfront district and the Baltimore Harbor.

Wallace returned to Philadelphia to teach at the University of Pennsylvania's Graduate School of Fine Arts (now known as the School of Design) as professor of planning and urban design. In 1963, he co-authored, with Ian McHarg, the Plan for the Green Spring and Worthington Valleys, an 80-square-mile (210 km^{2}) semi-rural area northwest of Baltimore in the suburban Baltimore County. The key idea in the Valleys Plan was the preservation of the valleys as largely undeveloped open space, and the diversion of development to the surrounding plateaus and to the east of the Baltimore-Harrisburg Expressway (Interstate 83). The plan was praised by Lewis Mumford as "brilliantly conceived", and was republished by McHarg as a chapter in his book Design with Nature. McHarg wrote in his autobiography, A Quest for Life, that by the 1970s, Wallace was "indisputably, the dominant city planner in the United States". The valleys northwest of Baltimore remain open and generally rural to this day.

== Inner Harbor plan ==
When Wallace received the assignment to prepare the later Inner Harbor Master Plan, also in 1963, he asked McHarg, architect/landscape architect William H. Roberts and architect/urban designer Thomas A. Todd to join him in founding the partnership firm Wallace McHarg Roberts & Todd (WMRT). With Wallace as partner in charge, the plan established the basic principles for development. Over the next 25 years Wallace and his partners were the designers of all of the Inner Harbor's infrastructure, promenades, piers, bridges and fountains, and the design controls for all private development. By 1980, with the addition of developer James Rouse's "festival marketplaces" of Harborplace along the promenade, the project had become a well-known urban success story of the 1980s.

== Lower Manhattan plan ==
Following the Inner Harbor plan, Mayor John Lindsay and the City of New York retained WMRT in 1965 (with Whittelsey, Conklin and Rossant as local architects) to prepare a master plan for the moribund Lower Manhattan district. Excavation for the World Trade Center's foundations was underway, and the plan was to prepare a response to the WTC's impact. Wallace developed an urban design and growth modeling procedure that evaluated existing conditions, determined the susceptibility-to-change, forecast the probability-of-change, and proposed a design response. The catalytic idea in the Lower Manhattan Plan (LMP) was to develop a predominantly residential community on land created by filling between the bulkhead and pier head lines at both Hudson and East Rivers, adjacent to the single-use commercial centers. Public walkways would be provided at the water's edge, linked by pedestrian ways to the centers and subway stations. The districts' elevated expressways would be depressed. The LMP won the Municipal Art Society of New York's Honor Award and was published in Progressive Architecture. Over the next decade, the firm developed plans for the central areas of New Orleans, Buffalo in New York, Miami, Orlando, and Jacksonville in Florida, Oakland and Los Angeles in California, and Baltimore's MetroCenter, all employing Wallace's growth modeling method combined with catalytic projects unique to each.

The LMP's full public access to the rivers and continuous walkways at the water's edge caught the attention of John Weingart, director of New Jersey's Division of Coastal Zone Management. Part of the New Jersey Department of Environmental Protection, his division had been assigned regulatory control over a 300-foot (91 m)-deep coastal waterfront, and he saw the LMP concept as applicable. He retained Wallace Roberts & Todd (after McHarg left the firm) to prepare the plan and develop design guidelines for the 18-mile (29 km), nine-community facility. Mandated for both public and private developers, so far 75% of the Hudson River Waterfront Walkway is completed or in planning.

== Recognition ==
Wallace received the John Harbeson Award from AIA Philadelphia for distinguished service to the profession in 2002 and the American Planning Association's Distinguished Leadership Award in 2003. He was the author of Urban Planning/My Way, a memoir published by the Planners Press in 2004 that features case studies that examine the evolution of large-scale urban development in the 20th century. In 2008, both APA Pennsylvania and National APA selected Wallace for the 2009 AICP National Planning Pioneer Award, in recognition of his contributions to the planning profession, as having significantly and positively redirected planning with long-term results.

Wallace was also a teacher throughout his career, first at the University of Chicago, then at the University of Pennsylvania, where he taught for 17 years.

== Books ==
- "Urban Planning/My Way:From Baltimore's Inner Harbor to Lower Manhattan and Beyond" by David A. Wallace, (2004), ISBN 1-884829-89-9
