= Jot D. Carpenter =

Jot David Carpenter
- Born: March 19, 1938; San Francisco, California
- Died: February 17, 2000 (aged 61); Columbus, Ohio
- Education: University of Georgia, BLA; Harvard University, MLA
- Occupation: Architect
- Awards: Fellow American Society of Landscape Architects

Jot D. Carpenter (March 19, 1938, in San Francisco, California – February 17, 2000 in Columbus, Ohio) was an American landscape architect and Professor of Landscape Architecture in the Knowlton School of Architecture at Ohio State University.

== Education and career ==
Carpenter earned a Bachelor of Landscape Architecture from the University of Georgia in 1960, and a Master of Landscape Architecture from the Harvard Graduate School of Design in 1962. He served as a Lieutenant in the United States Air Force from 1962 - 1965. His professional interests focused on landscape architectural site planning, history of the profession of landscape architecture, and AutoCAD/GIS applications for site planning and design. He was a member of the faculty of the Ohio State University for 28 years, including 14 years teaching and 14 years as Chair of the Department of Landscape Architecture, and served as a consultant as well as a volunteer with the National Park Service. He authored numerous publications, one of which, his 1974 Handbook of Landscape Architectural Construction, is recognized as one of the most influential books in the history of landscape architecture. Thirteen of his works are widely held by libraries as references for the profession.

== Honors ==
During Carpenter's distinguished career he earned many honors. He was elected a Fellow of the American Society of Landscape Architects (ASLA), which he served as President from 1978 to 1979, in addition to his active service in several society offices, and earned the ASLA President's Medal in 1982. In 1999 he was awarded the University of Georgia, College of Environment and Design Distinguished Alumni Medal in recognition of his exemplary professional achievements. In 2000, the ASLA established the Jot Carpenter Prize to recognize the work of outstanding university professors in the area of Landscape Architecture; the prestigious award is accompanied by a medal. Also in 2000, Carpenter's family, friends, colleagues, and students established the Jot D. Carpenter Scholarship to honor his years of service and devotion to the school and students. His career-long success earned him recognition by Who's Who in America in its 43rd (1984-1985) through 53rd (1999) editions.
