= Carol R. Johnson =

American landscape architect (1929–2020)

Carol Roxane Johnson (September 6, 1929 – December 11, 2020) was a landscape architect and educator notable for being one of the first women in her field. She founded Carol R. Johnson Associates, a landscape architecture firm in Boston, and designed large-scale projects throughout the United States. She was also a professor at Harvard's Graduate School of Design. Johnson retired in 2016. She died on December 11, 2020, in Boothbay Harbor, Maine, at the age of 91.

== Background and education ==
Carol Roxane Johnson was born in Elizabeth, New Jersey, on September 6, 1929. From a young age she enjoyed a connection with nature, partaking in hiking, camping, and writing poems about the landscape. Her family enjoyed vacations in Vermont and at Martha's Vineyard. As a child she inherited her brother's small time newspaper, The Boulevard Bugle, and increased its readership twenty-fold, marking her first foray into business.

She received her undergraduate degree from Wellesley College in 1951. Johnson worked briefly at the New England Nursery where she did plant propagation and sold plants to the surrounding community. Here, she began giving design advice to customers and became involved with the Harvard Graduate School of Design. Johnson went on to earn a graduate degree in landscape architecture from Harvard in 1957. Johnson held honorary degrees from Wentworth Institute of Technology and Gettysburg College.

== Career ==
After graduate school, Johnson took a position with The Architects Collaborative in 1958. Just one year later, she founded her own firm, Carol R. Johnson Associates. Between 1959 and 1970, Johnson operated her practice initially out of her apartment in Cambridge and then out of a small office on Mount Auburn Street in Harvard Square. In 1970, the firm changed its name from Carol R. Johnson, Landscape Architect, to Carol R. Johnson & Associates to reflect the growing importance of the employees to the practice. In September 1975, the firm was incorporated in the Commonwealth of Massachusetts as Carol R. Johnson & Associates, Inc. The firm is known today as CRJA-IBI Group and has expanded to 10 principals and branch offices outside Boston.

Johnson's work is recognized for the emphasis she placed on sites' natural and cultural contexts and history. She also focused on the social purpose of design and was part of President Johnson's Model Cities Program while working on North Common in Lowell, Massachusetts in 1972. She has overseen international projects focused on site development, open space planning, master planning, and urban development. Clients have included colleges and universities, corporations, and public agencies. Towards the end of her career, she took a backseat in managing her firm and focused on projects internationally, such as the U.S. Embassy in Tunis, Tunisia, and at colleges and universities, including Cornell Campus Center at Rollins College.

In addition to her practice, Johnson taught in the Planning Department at Harvard's Graduate School of Design. She was on staff from 1966 to 1973. She was also a frequent panelist and lecturer on landscape architecture beyond Harvard and has presented papers at several international conferences. She also served as a Trustee for the Hubbard Educational Trust, which seeks to support education in landscape architecture across the United States. For ten years, Johnson served as a City of Boston Civic Design Commissioner. Finally, Ms. Johnson became a Fellow of the American Society of Landscape Architects in 1982 and has served as chair of the Board of Designators of the George B. Henderson Foundation and on the Massachusetts Trustees of Reservations landscape and historic buildings advisors committee.

Johnson is described as a pioneer and leader in landscape architecture, not least because of what she achieved as a woman in the field. She was the first American woman to receive the American Society of Landscape Architects (ASLA) Medal, in 1998. She was featured in a Harvard symposium focusing on significant women in landscape architecture in 2011. She was also a leader in her field, irrespective of gender. She began her practice when the field was first starting to establish itself. She was one of the first landscape architects to work with scientists on brownfield remediation. For the Mystic River Reservation in Medford and Somerville, MA, she transformed a toxic landfill into a beautiful riverside park. This project was the first on-site soil mixing project in the U.S., and was long before "sustainable design" was part of the popular vernacular. The transformation began in the late 1970s and was completed in the early 80's. It was an early example of Johnson's firm's ability to meld its interest in history (in this case Charles Elliot's approach to scenic and natural resource values) with state-of-the-art environmental sciences. A separate land reclamation and restoration effort at a former power plant site on Lake Cayuga in upstate New York helped to restore the site to a natural meadow landscape, which would subsequently go through the normal process of becoming forest again.

Between 2000 and 2011 CRJA did a majority of their work on projects in the Middle East which motivated them to establish a temporary studio in Abu Dhabi from 2007 to 2011.

Johnson died on December 11, 2020, in Boothbay Harbor, Maine.

=== Major works ===
- Hunnewell Visitors Center of the Arnold Arboretum (Boston, Massachusetts)
- US Federal Courthouse (Boston, Massachusetts)
- Riverfront Revitalization (Hartford, Connecticut)
- Lechmere Canal Park (Cambridge, Massachusetts)
- Old Harbor Park (Boston, Massachusetts)
- John F. Kennedy Memorial Park (Cambridge, Massachusetts)
- John Marshall Place Park (Washington, District of Columbia)
- Brownfield Remediation: Mystic River Reservation (Massachusetts)
- Bell Station on Lake Cayuga (New York)
- Mayor Curley Park (Boston, Massachusetts)
- Boston's Big Dig Project
- Moakley Courthouse Harborwalk and Park
- Massachusetts National Cemetery (Bourne, MA)
- Shae-Tze Island (Taipei)
- LG Chemical Research Park (Korea)
- Shams Island Central Park (Abu Dhabi, UAE)
- The American University (Cairo, Egypt)
- Marasy Waterfront Residential Complex (Abu Dhabi, UAE)

=== Campus work ===
- Boston College
- Duke University
- Agnes Scott College (Decatur, Georgia)
- Wellesley College
- Williams College
- Harvard University
- Boston University.
- Colby College

=== Awards ===
- National Endowment for the Arts' Excellence in Universal Design Award, 1996
- First woman to win ASLA Medal, 1998
- Alumnae Achievement Award, Wellesley College, 2004
- Honorary Degrees from Boston Architectural College, Wentworth Institute of Technology, and Gettysburg College
