= John O. Simonds =

John Ormsbee Simonds
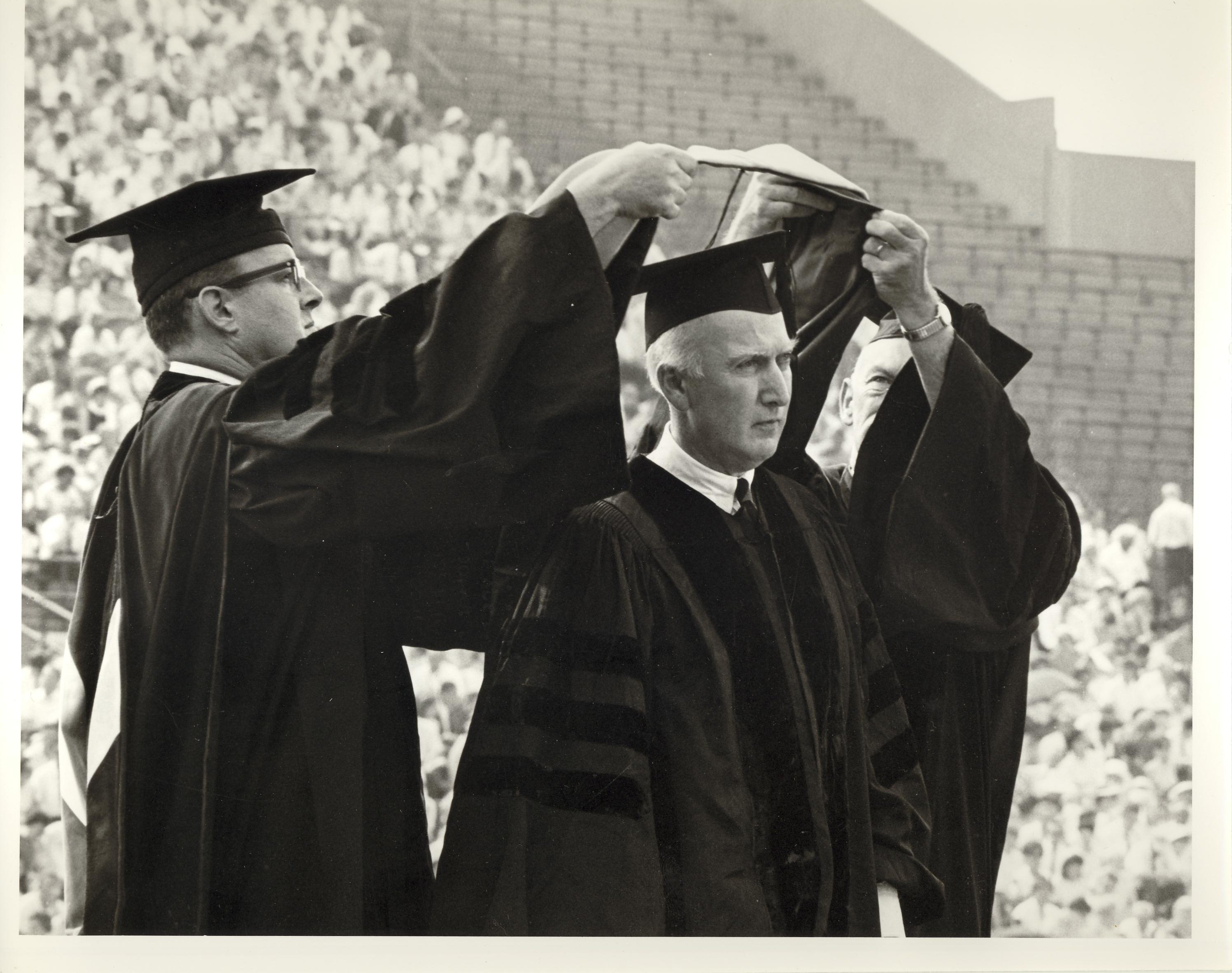
- Born: March 11, 1913; Jamestown, North Dakota
- Died: May 6, 2005 (aged 92); Pittsburgh, Pennsylvania
- Occupations: Landscape Architect, Planner, and Environmentalist
- Spouse: Margorie Simonds
- Parent(s): Guy Wallace and Margueritte Simonds

John Ormsbee Simonds was born in Jamestown, North Dakota on March 11, 1913. He was a visionary landscape architect, planner, educator, and environmentalist. Simonds was an original modernist landscape architect and one of the most influential and well-known of his time.

== Career ==
In 1935 he graduated with a B.S. in Landscape Architecture from Michigan State University. He went on to receive a Master's from Harvard Graduate School of Design. After finishing school, Simonds and his brother Phil established their company, Simonds and Simonds, later known as Environmental Planning and Development Partnership. While continuing his company he published his first book, Landscape Architecture: The Shaping of Man's Natural Environment.

The basis of Simonds' firm was centered on parks, recreational facilities, playgrounds, urban area and space, and many large gardens.

Mellon Square, in Pittsburgh, was built in 1951 and is one of Simonds major designs. The garden was one of the first and few placed on top a parking garage. "Mellon Square was intended by Simonds to be an oasis, a civic movement, and a gathering space in the midst of downtown office towers." The social movement of World War II and the Pittsburgh Renaissance both greatly influenced Simonds' work. During this time Pittsburgh was in the need of deep restoration. The Simonds and Simonds Company became very popular, taking in many new commissions, the Mellon Square being one of the first and most important reconstructions of civic space.

In 1960 the company, now the Environmental Planning and Design Partnership, expanded their work away from Pittsburgh. The Chicago Botanic Garden became well known for its impact on landscape architecture. The botanic garden was built from an unpleasant source of land in Glencoe, Illinois. "The site covers over 300 acres, featuring a series of island gardens with an administration and visitor education center on the largest island." Simonds created a garden that incorporated an area for education of plants and actual touchable exhibits. Like the Mellon Square, the focus of creating relationships between human and plant can be seen within this design.

Simonds was awarded a Doctorate in Science from Michigan State University, in 1968.

In the 1970s, Florida was in the process of creating new communities. During this time, Simonds changed his focus to large scale developments, allowing Florida's new communities to be options of work. Pelican Bay, located in Naples, Florida, became one of Simonds' great large-scale projects. He also established and developed the term PUD, Planned Unit Development, within the bay community. The greatness of this design was the combination of nature and community with nothing overpowering the scene. The design involved the use of nature features, which enabled the area to preserve the ecology of the region. Pelican Bay became widely appreciated and recognized after receiving the New Community Development Award for Excellence by the Urban Land Institute.

In 1973 Simonds received his first and most honorable award, the ASLA medal. Shortly after being awarded, Simonds released another publication titled, Earthscape: A Manual of Environmental Planning. In 1983 and 1998 he released the second and then third edition of his publication Landscape Architecture. Before his death in May 2005, Simonds received his last award, the ASLA President's Centennial Medal in 1998.

Simonds took part in 500 projects and was a planner of 80 communities and 4 new towns. Some of his famous works include:

- Pittsburgh Aviary - Conservatory
- Interstate 66 in Virginia
- Allegheny Commons

== Influences ==
The first most important influence was Simonds' father, Guy Wallace, a Presbyterian minister. Simonds' father helped him to develop a love and appreciation for nature, and the ability to speak to others with great enthusiasm. As his designs developed, the use of incorporating nature with quality and balance became his foremost goal and attribute to design.

Simonds' design was also greatly influenced by his travels to Asia. He began to use aspects of the Zen philosophy and their idea of the garden being harmonious. Simonds wanted the garden to become a way for humans to create a relationship with plants. With his travels to Asia and studies under modern architects Walter Gropius and Marcel Breuer at Harvard, Simonds' designs became the best they could be and remain a part of today's society, influencing rising architects.

== Significance to landscape architecture ==
Simonds moved the focus in landscape architecture from plants to the idea of plants and human relationship. He created a movement of change from landscape specialists to landscape environmentalists, urban designers, and regional planners. The style in which he created was no longer just a design, but rather it became a place for people to experience. John Ormsbee Simonds will always have a great impact on Landscape Architecture and will continue to influence many landscape designs.

One designs not places, or spaces, or things, one designs experiences.

— John Ormsbee Simonds

== See also ==
- Landscape Architecture
- Urban Planning
- Landscape design history
