= Marilyn Jordan Taylor =

American architect

- Born: Marilyn Jordan; March 31, 1949 (age 77); Montezuma, Iowa
- Occupation: architect
- Years active: 1974-present
- Known for: airport design

Marilyn Jordan Taylor (born 1949) is an American architect, who was a partner at Skidmore, Owings & Merrill since the early 1980s and served as its first female chairman. She specializes in urban architectural projects and designed the master plan for the Manhattanville expansion, the Consolidated Edison East River Greenway as well as airports from the John F. Kennedy International Airport terminal 4 expansion to the SkyCity at the Hong Kong International Airport. Between 2008 and 2016, she served as the Dean of the University of Pennsylvania School of Design.

== Biography ==
Marilyn Jordan was born on March 31, 1949, in Montezuma, Iowa, and moved with her family to Washington, D.C., when she was ten years old. She graduated from Radcliffe College in 1969 and went on to attend the MIT Graduate School of Architecture. Jordan finished her master's degree in Architecture at UC Berkeley in 1974 and joined Skidmore, Owings & Merrill's (SOM) Washington, DC Office. Around a decade later, she became a partner and relocated to the New York City office of SOM.

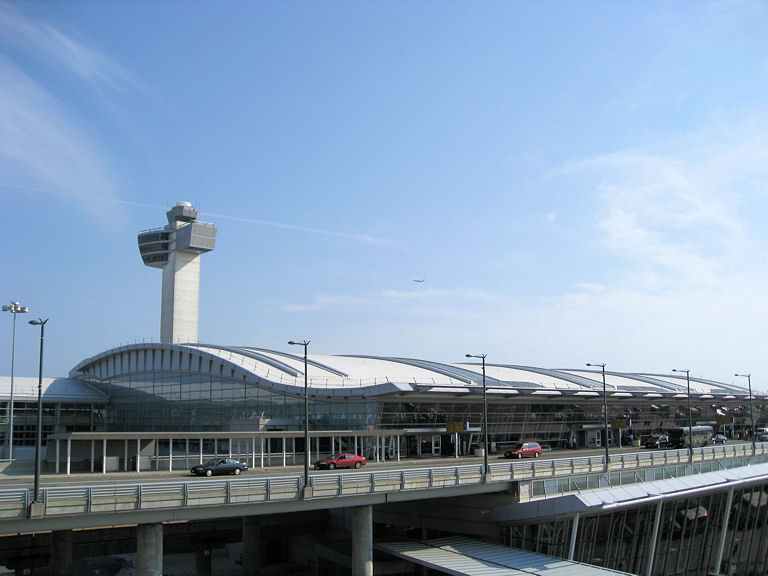
JFK International Airport, Terminal 4

Taylor is known for her use of design in urban places working with infrastructure and public spaces. Some of the projects she has led include the master plan for Columbia University's Manhattanville expansion, the East River Waterfront project, the reclamation of the Con Edison East River station for the East River Greenway, the Memorial Sloan Kettering Cancer Center's Mortimer B. Zuckerman Research Center, the "New Building" of John Jay College, among others. In addition, she founded and then directed the Airports and Transportation Practice at SOM. She designed Ben Gurion Airport in Tel Aviv, an expansion at Dulles International Airport in Washington, JFK terminal 4, the terminal for Continental Airlines at Newark Liberty International Airport, Singapore Changi Airport's Terminal 3, and the SkyCity at the Hong Kong International Airport.

In 2001, Taylor became the chair of SOM, the first woman to head the company. Then in 2005, she was elected as chair of the Urban Land Institute and two years later, in 2007, Crain's New York Business titled her as one of the "Most Powerful Women in New York" because of her urban planning projects. Taylor took over as dean of the University of Pennsylvania's School of Design in 2008 and in 2014, agreed to extend her appointment until 2016.

Taylor has served on the advisory board for Amtrak's Northeast Corridor expansion project, the Delaware River Waterfront Planning and Development Board, the Partnership for New York City and as the President of the New York City Chapter of the American Institute of Architects. She was awarded with an honorary doctorate of Humane Letters from the Georgetown University School of Continuing Studies in 2014 for her interdisciplinary approach to urban planning and contributions to responsible development. In 2015, the Architectural Record granted her the Women in Architecture Award for mentoring other women and advancing the roles of women in the profession.

== Works ==
- 1986 Worldwide Plaza
- 1992 Tribeca Bridge
- 1997 Dulles International Airport
- 1999 Proposal for repurposing the James A. Farley Postal Building as the Amtrak Pennsylvania Station III
- 2000 JFK International Airport Terminal 4
- 2001 Consolidated Edison East River Greenway
- 2002 Columbia University's Manhattanville
- 2002 Continental Airlines terminal at Newark Liberty International Airport
- 2002 East River Waterfront
- 2002 Ben Gurion International Airport, Tel Aviv
- 2004 Sky City, Hong Kong
- 2007 Changi Airport Terminal 3, Singapore
- 2008 Mortimer B. Zuckerman Research Center at the Memorial Sloan Kettering Cancer Center
- 2009 Riverside South
- 2011 Campus of John Jay College

== Gallery ==
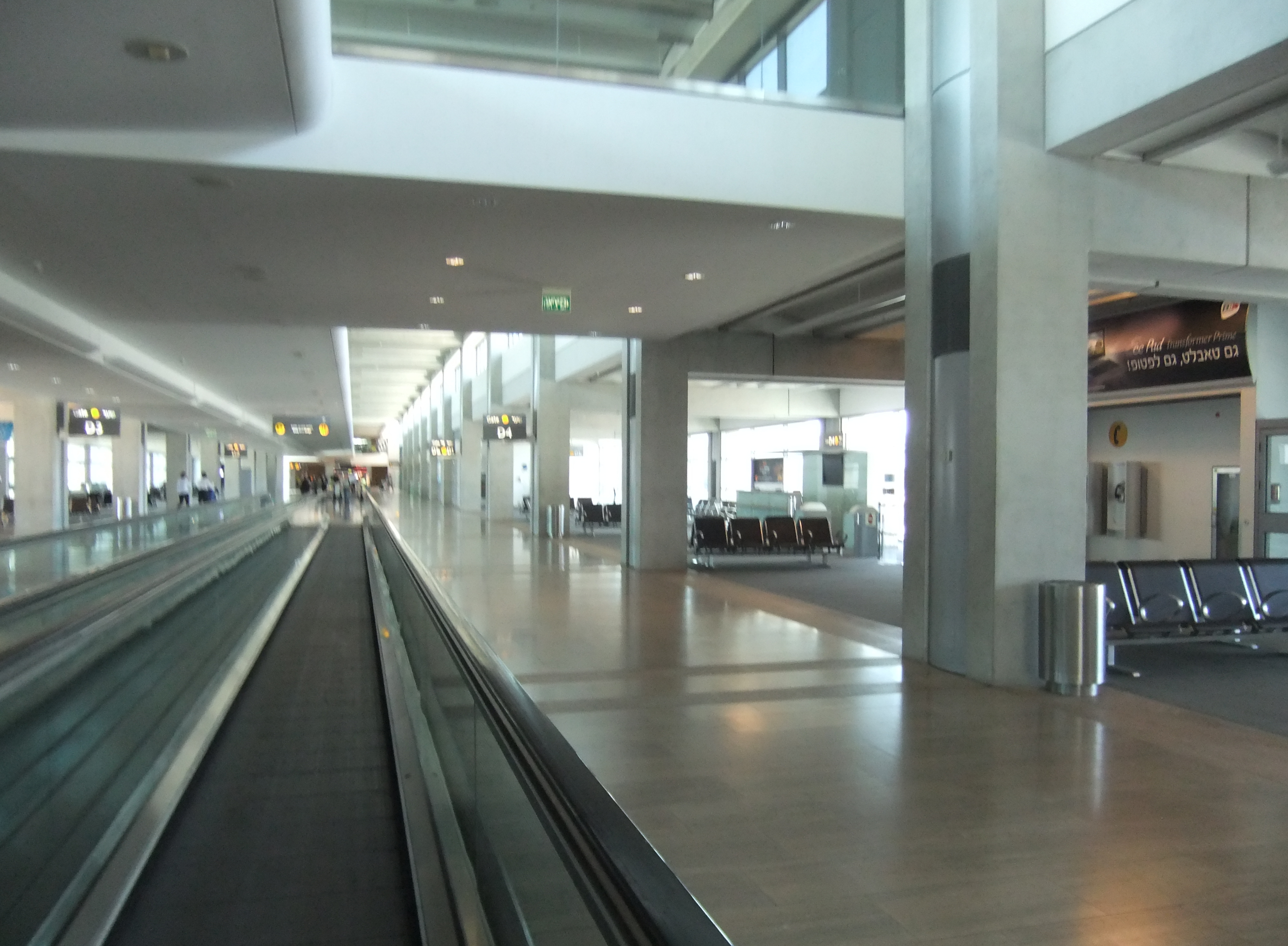
Ben Gurion International Airport

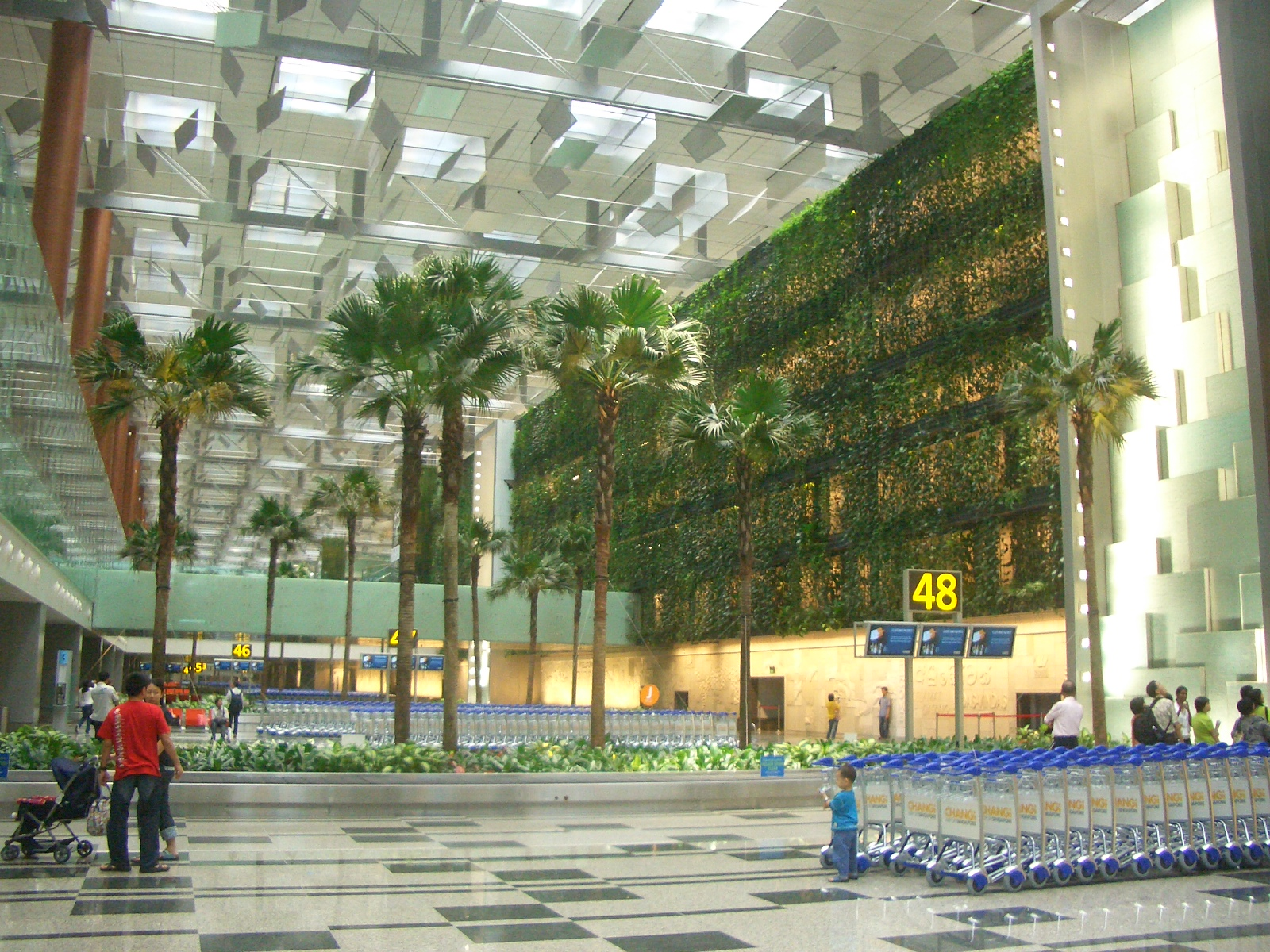
Changi airport, Terminal 3 baggage claim, Singapore

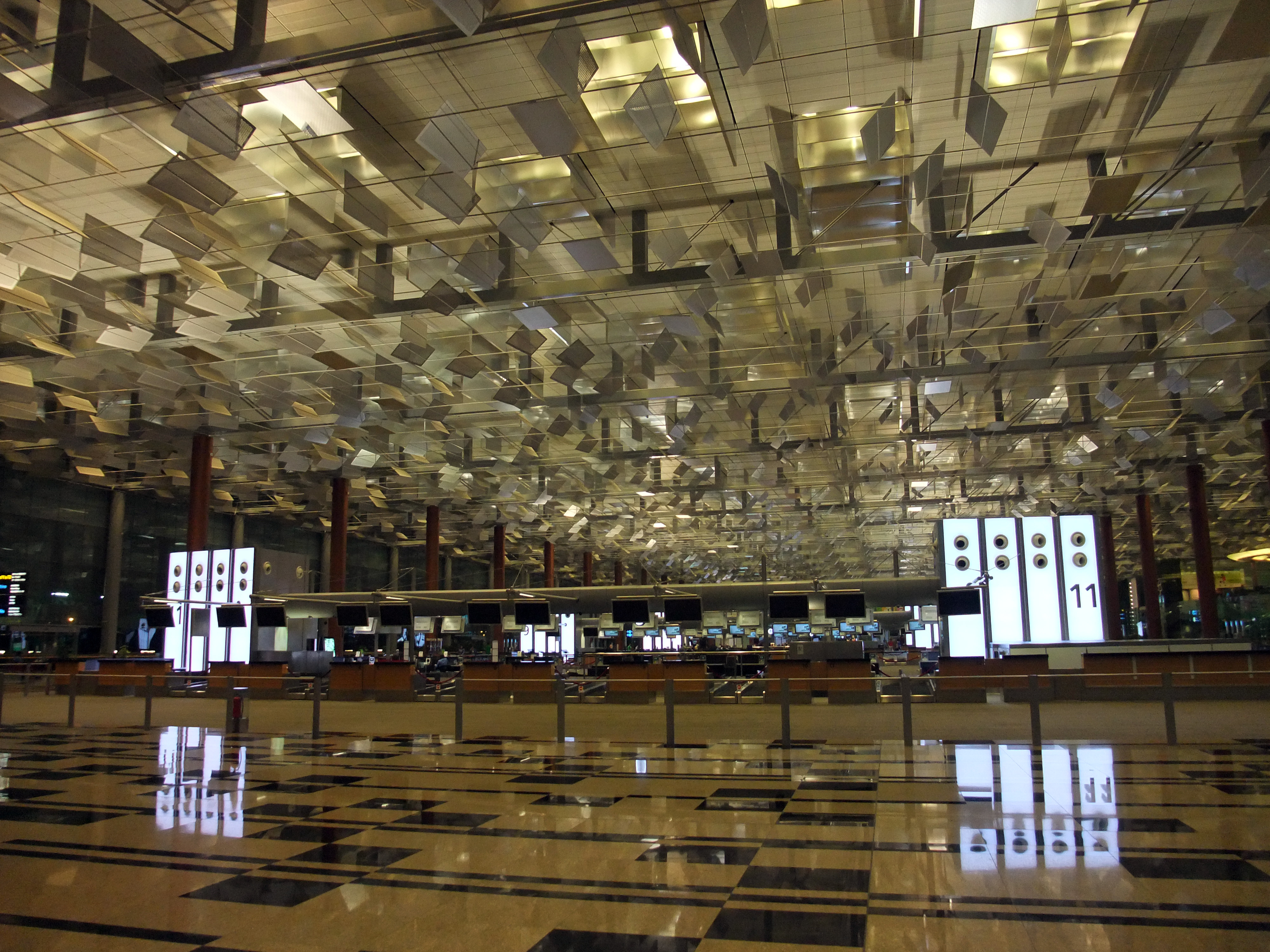
Changi Airport Terminal 3, Singapore

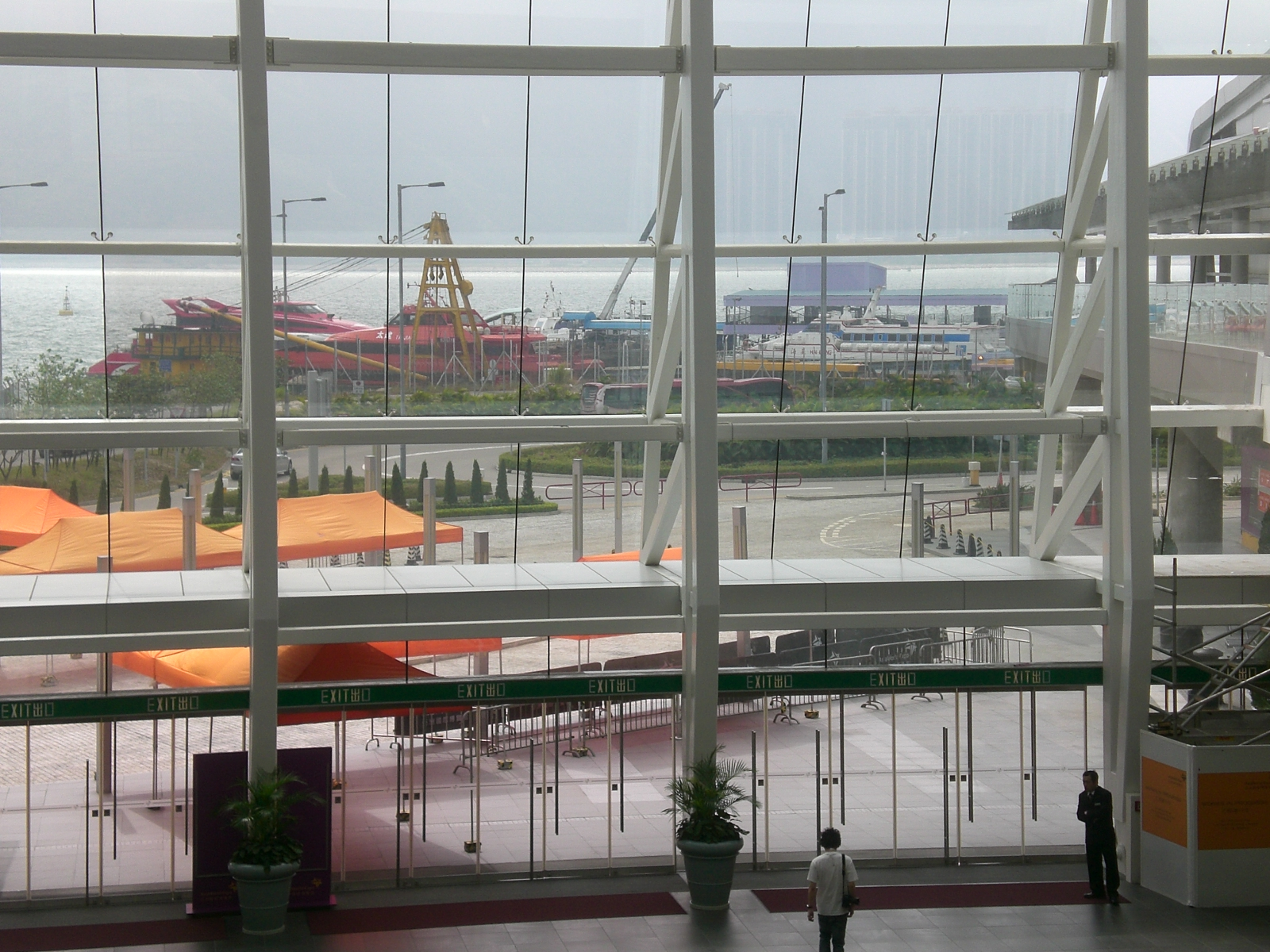
Hong Kong Airport SkyCity SkyPier

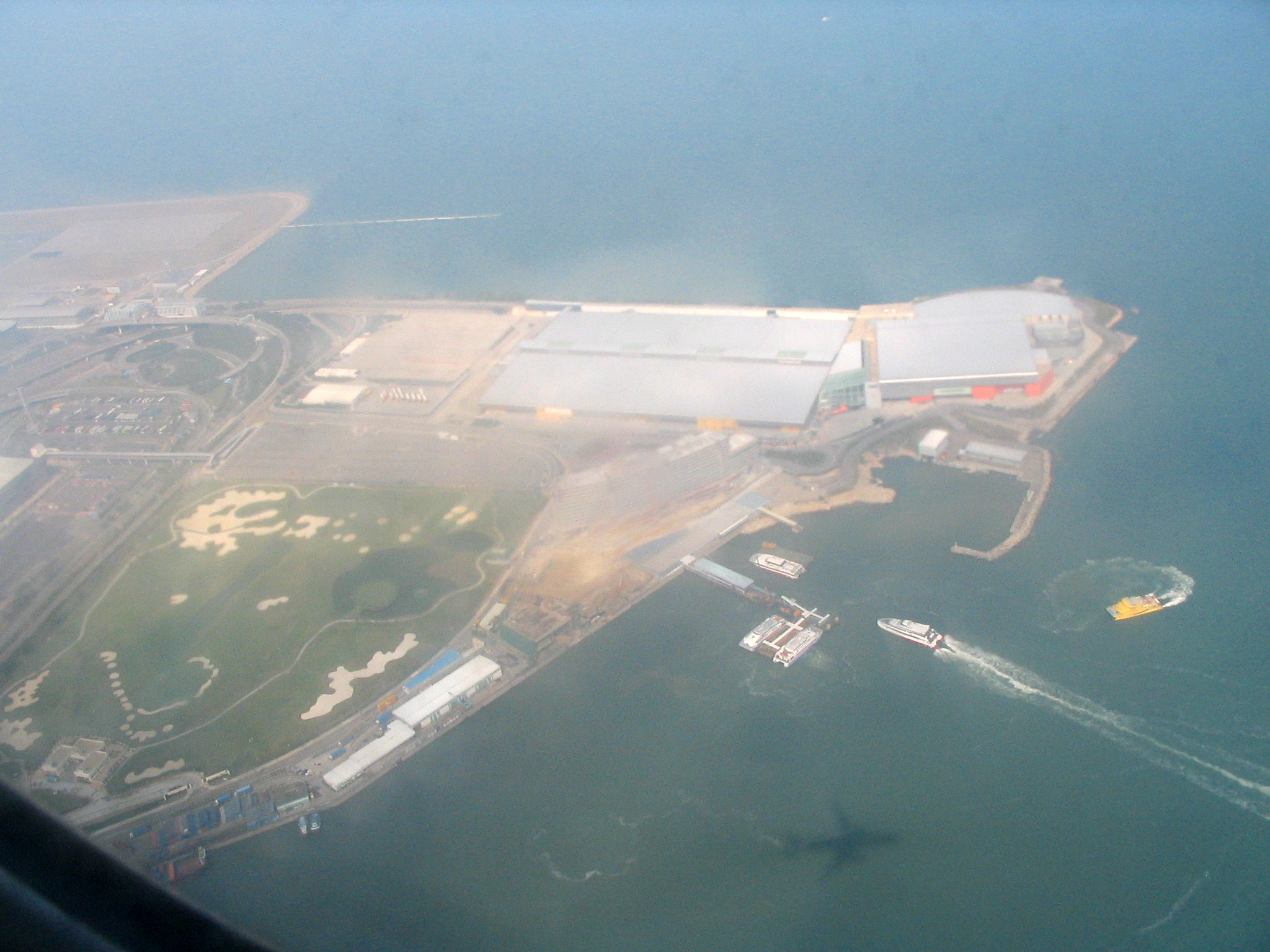
Hong Kong International Airport, SkyCity

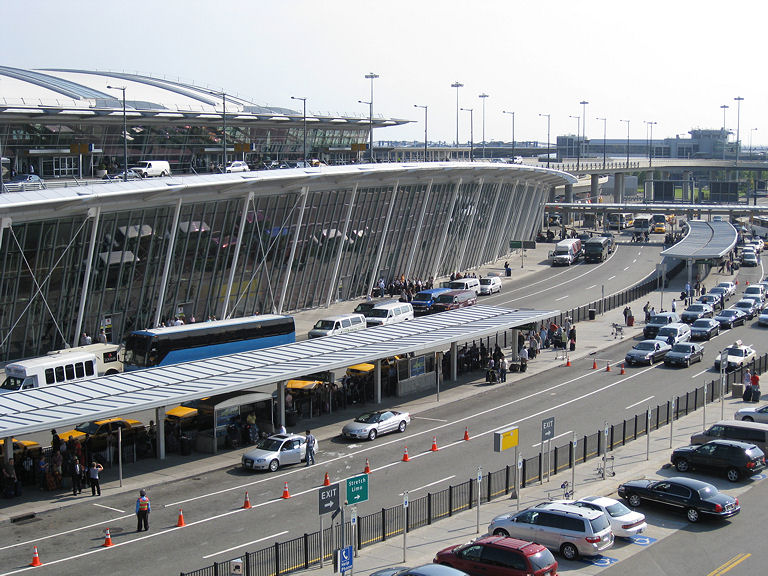
JFK International Airport, Terminal 4

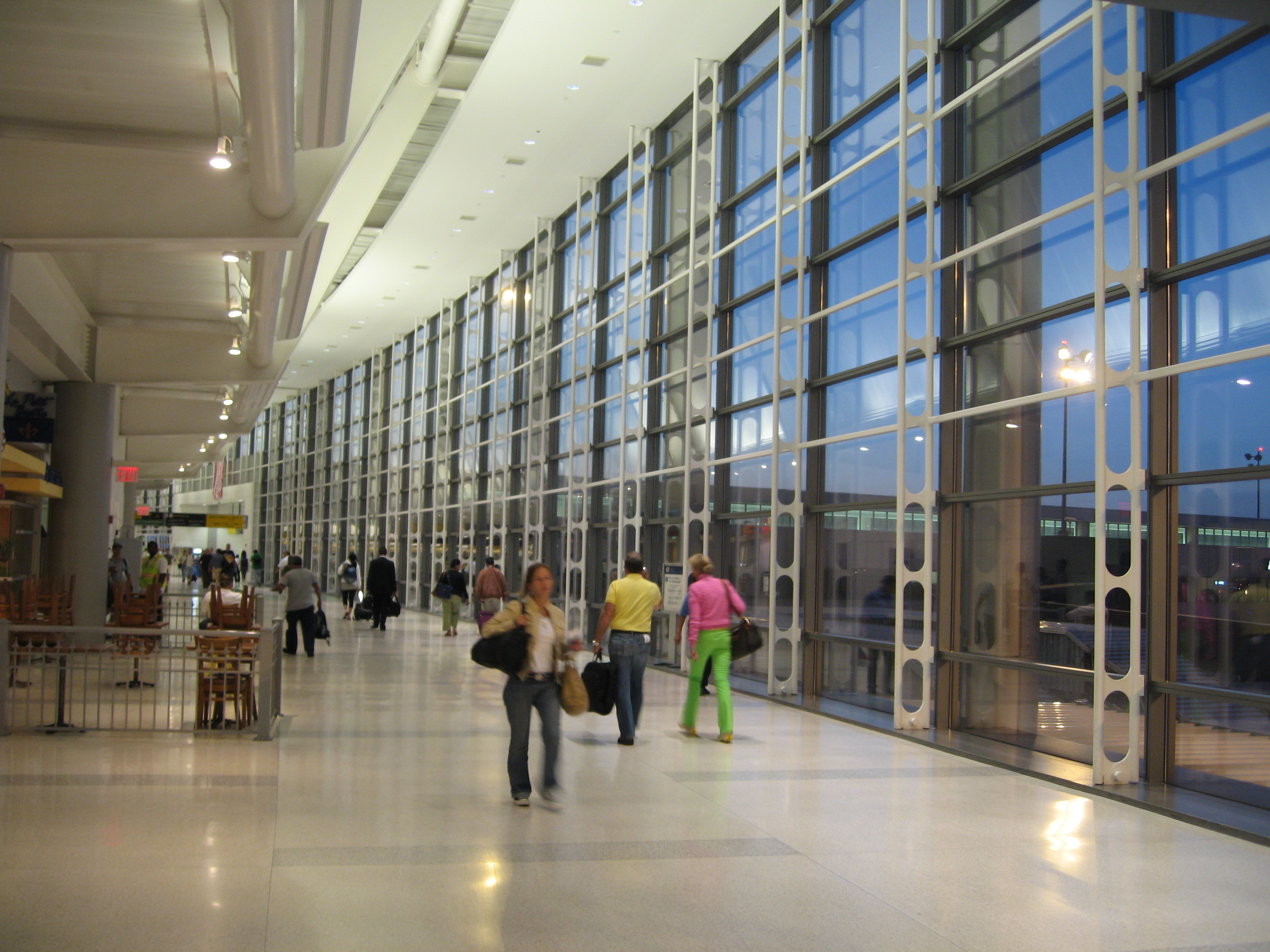
Newark Liberty International Airport, Terminal C

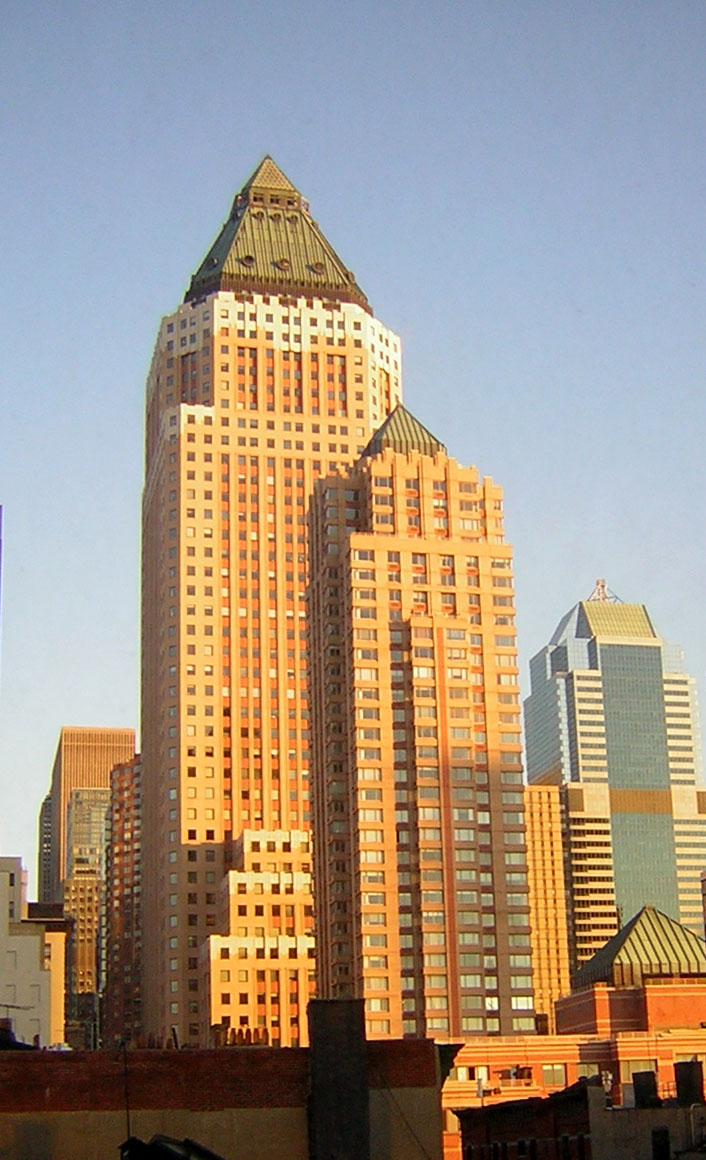
One Worldwide Plaza, New York City

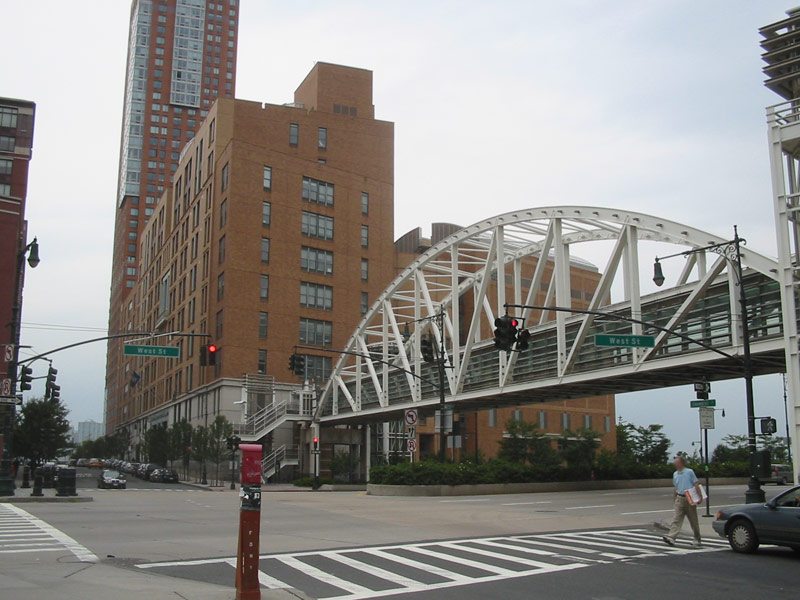
Tribeca Bridge, New York City

== Sources ==
- Lewis, Anna M. (2014). Women of Steel and Stone: 22 Inspirational Architects, Engineers, and Landscape Designers. Chicago, Illinois: Chicago Review Press. p. 88. ISBN 978-1-61374-511-3.
