= Kent Butler =

American urban planner

Kent Scott Butler (January 8, 1951 – May 13, 2011) was an American urban and environmental planner, and associate dean of the Community and Regional Planning program at the University of Texas at Austin School of Architecture until his death on May 13, 2011. He died while hiking in Yosemite National Park.

He was born in Olmsted County, Minnesota. Between 1973 and 1977, he studied and obtained his bachelor's degree, masters, and doctorate degrees at the University of Wisconsin-Madison. Butler is known for articles on development planning and co-authored the popular educational reference Planning and Urban Design Standards: Student Edition. Butler helped create the Barton Springs-Edwards Aquifer groundwater management district, and the plan for the Balcones Canyonlands Preserve. This preserve complements a federal wildlife refuge of the same name and is planned to become one of the largest urban preserves in the United States.
