= Joe A. Porter =

American landscape architect

- Occupation: Professor
- Known for: Landscape architect

Joe A. Porter is a professional landscape architect and Fellow of the American Society of Landscape Architects. Porter has worked with new community, natural resource, and resort developers to advance the art of community development through design. In 1969 Porter co-founded Design Workshop, a firm practising landscape architecture, land planning, urban design and tourism planning. He is an adjunct professor in the graduate program in landscape architecture at the University of Colorado.

== Education ==
Porter graduated from the Utah State University, Porter received a Master's degree in Landscape Architecture from the University of Illinois

== Co-founder of Design Workshop ==
In 1969 Joe Porter and Don Ensign founded Design Workshop. The name is derived from the collaborative process with which they taught in the landscape architecture department at North Carolina State University. The firm practices landscape architecture, land planning, urban design and tourism planning. They combine principles of smart growth, sustainable design and environmentally sound planning to reconcile economic needs with the preservation of scenic, cultural and community values. Their earliest projects engaged them in planning new communities in Columbia, Maryland, and Raleigh, North Carolina, as well as resort work on the Outer Banks of North Carolina. Since its inception, Design Workshop has earned more than seventy design awards from such organizations as the American Society of Landscape Architects, the American Planning Association and the Urban Land Institute. Presently, the firm comprises 140 designers, planners and support staff in six North American offices in Aspen, Denver, Salt Lake City, Lake Tahoe, Austin and Asheville, North Carolina.
