= Arthur Edwin Bye =

American landscape architect (1919–2001)

Arthur Edwin Bye (1919–2001) was an American landscape architect born in the Netherlands.

== Biography ==
Bye was born on August 25, 1919, in Arnhem to a Dutch mother and American father, who were both art historians. He moved to America at a young age and went on to study horticulture at Penn State University. It was as a horticulture student that Bye was first exposed to the work of Frank Lloyd Wright. Bye admired how Wright's designs reflected native prairie landscapes. Another of Bye's contemporaries was the Danish landscape architect, Jens Jensen, who expressed local ecology in his landscapes.

After graduating in 1942, Bye worked briefly with the U.S. Forest Service and the National Park Service before opening his own landscape architecture firm: A. E. Bye & Associates in Greenwich, Connecticut. As a landscape architect, Bye's designs were comparable to the work of Wright and Jensen as they were created based on the local ecology and frequently inspired by prairies. Many of his contemporaries were not focused on local conditions and native plants, instead favoring exotic species and foreign garden types. Bye's work is also said to have been strongly influenced by the 18th century English garden aesthetics of Humphry Repton.

== Interpretation of the landscape ==
Bye's interpretation of the landscape was explored in many ways. One of his interests was photography. Bye expressed his fascination with the natural landscape in the form of photograph essays. Over the span of 40 years, he took more than 40,000 photographs of the landscape and would assign a word to describe the mood or quality that he felt it represented and/or evoked. Through these types of explorations, Bye established criteria for how to create natural landscapes. In complexity, "the calculated opposition of hard and soft, dark and light, [through which] we can imitate the complexity of a natural landscape". He also used other words such as "humor", "whimsy", "serenity", "mystery", "brittleness", "cleanness", and "elegance".

His detailed analysis of the landscape led to manipulations of the land which were considered subtle and meaningful. These were not only rooted in the experiential qualities, but also in ecological processes.

Bye's designs were created from intuition. He claimed it only took 2 to 3 seconds to "see" a final site, not all the details, but the overall concept. While some sites were carefully planned before construction, others were created on site. He would direct a hired bulldozer operator around until he was satisfied with the topography of the site.

== Notable works ==
At George Soros residence, Bye created a soft, undulating topography which allowed for a planned pattern of melting snow, while also creating modulations of light and dark. This technique mitigated a reduction of water runoff to the ocean, keeping the rainwater in the local water table. This was made possible through Bye's knowledge of local ecological conditions and physiography of the region.

With the ha-ha fence, Bye integrated a stone fence into the existing topography mimic the elements of the natural landscape. He manipulated the soil around the fence until he was satisfied with the tension between the shadows of the trees and the horizontal line of the undulating land. He was able to harmonize the shadows and earth, along with the fence and the forest edge in the background.

At the Connecticut residence, Bye created small gardens around the house which resemble natural landforms. The manufactured topographies evoked the nearby rocky seaside. He used local materials, such as granite and juniper. The granite was even extracted from the beach in front of the house.

The topography of a Massachusetts residence is another example of how Bye molded topography to highlight natural elements. Throughout all of his works, Bye was interested in using natural phenomena as ephemeral materials, such as fog, mist, snow, rain, light and shadows. While in the Soros residence he highlighted snow, here light and shadow were considered as strong features of the garden.
