= Frederick Steiner =

American ecologist (born 1949)

Frederick R. Steiner
- Born: 1949 (age 76–77); Dayton, Ohio, U.S.
- Education: University of Pennsylvania; University of Cincinnati
- Occupation: Environmental Planner

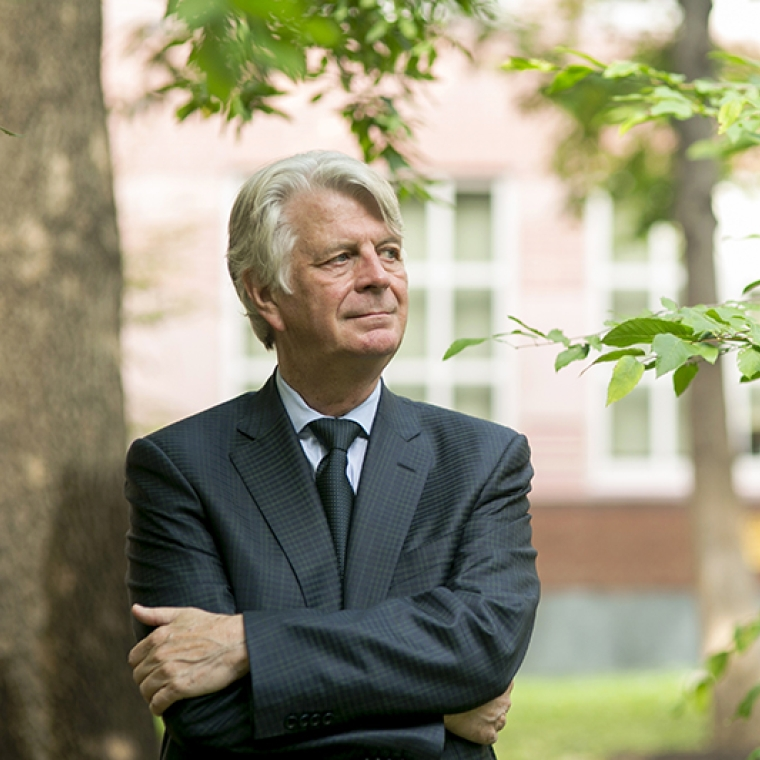
Official University of Pennsylvania photo of Fritz Steiner

Frederick R. "Fritz" Steiner is an American ecologist who currently serves as the Dean and Paley Professor for the University of Pennsylvania School of Design, having succeeded Marilyn Jordan Taylor in 2016. He is a fellow of the American Society of Landscape Architects and the American Academy in Rome. He teaches courses in the areas of landscape analysis, landscape architecture theory, and environmental impact assessment. His specialization is in ecological planning, historic preservation, environmental design, green building, and regional planning.

== Education ==
Steiner earned his Bachelor of Science degree in graphic design from the University of Cincinnati in 1972, followed by a Master of Community Planning degree, also from Cincinnati, in 1975. In 1977, he earned his Master of Regional Planning from the University of Pennsylvania, and in 1986 he earned both his Master of Arts and Ph.D. in City and Regional Planning from Penn. At the time he was a student in the Penn Department of Landscape Architecture and Regional Planning, it was chaired by Ian McHarg. As a Teaching Fellow at Penn in 1983, Steiner coordinated the LARP 501 studio with McHarg.

== Career ==
Formerly, he was Director of the School of Planning and Landscape Architecture, College of Architecture and Environmental Design at Arizona State University and previously taught at Washington State University, the University of Colorado-Denver, and the University of Pennsylvania. He was also awarded an honorary M.Phil. in Human Ecology from the College of the Atlantic. He has also served as a city planning commissioner and has worked with community groups, as well as national environmental and conservation organizations. He has been a visiting professor at Tsinghua University in Beijing, China, and was a Fulbright-Hays research scholar at Wageningen University in The Netherlands.

He is the former dean of the School of Architecture at the University of Texas at Austin, having stepped down from the position of Dean in 2016 to lead the University of Pennsylvania School of Design. Following the announcement of his new position in February 2016, Steiner stated his decision to leave UT Austin had been influenced by Texas Government Code Section 411.2031, which entitles licensed individuals to carry concealed handguns onto the campus of an institution of higher education--dubbed "Campus Carry." The Texas law went into effect on August 1, 2016.

In 2019, Steiner worked with Richard Weller, Karen M’Closkey, Billy Fleming, and William Whitaker to organize Design With Nature Now to celebrate the 50th anniversary of Ian McHarg's landmark book. The celebration involved a conference, three exhibitions, a book, and a special issue of the journal Socio-Ecological Practice Research.

Also in 2019, the University of Pennsylvania School of Design was renamed the Stuart Weitzman School of Design.

== Selected books ==
- The Politics of New Town Planning (1981)
- Ecological Planning for Farmlands Preservation (1981)
- The Living Landscape: An Ecological Approach to Landscape Planning (1991)
- Human Ecology: Following Nature's Lead
- Planning and Urban Design Standards (with Kent Butler 2006)
- Design for a Vulnerable Planet (2011)
- Urban Ecological Design (with Danilo Palazzo 2012)
- Nature and Cities: The Ecological Imperative for Urban Design and Planning (editor with George F. Thompson and Armando Carbonell 2016)
