= American Society of Landscape Architects =

American professional association

- Abbreviation: ASLA
- Formation: 1899; 127 years ago
- Founded at: New York City, New York, United States
- Type: Professional association
- Headquarters: Washington, D.C., U.S.
- Location: 636 I Street, NW, Washington, D.C., U.S.
- Members: 15,000+ (as of 2019)
- Official language: English
- President: Torey Carter-Conneen
- Website: asla.org

The American Society of Landscape Architects (ASLA) is a professional association for landscape architects in the United States. The ASLA's mission is to advance landscape architecture through advocacy, communication, education, and fellowship.

== History ==
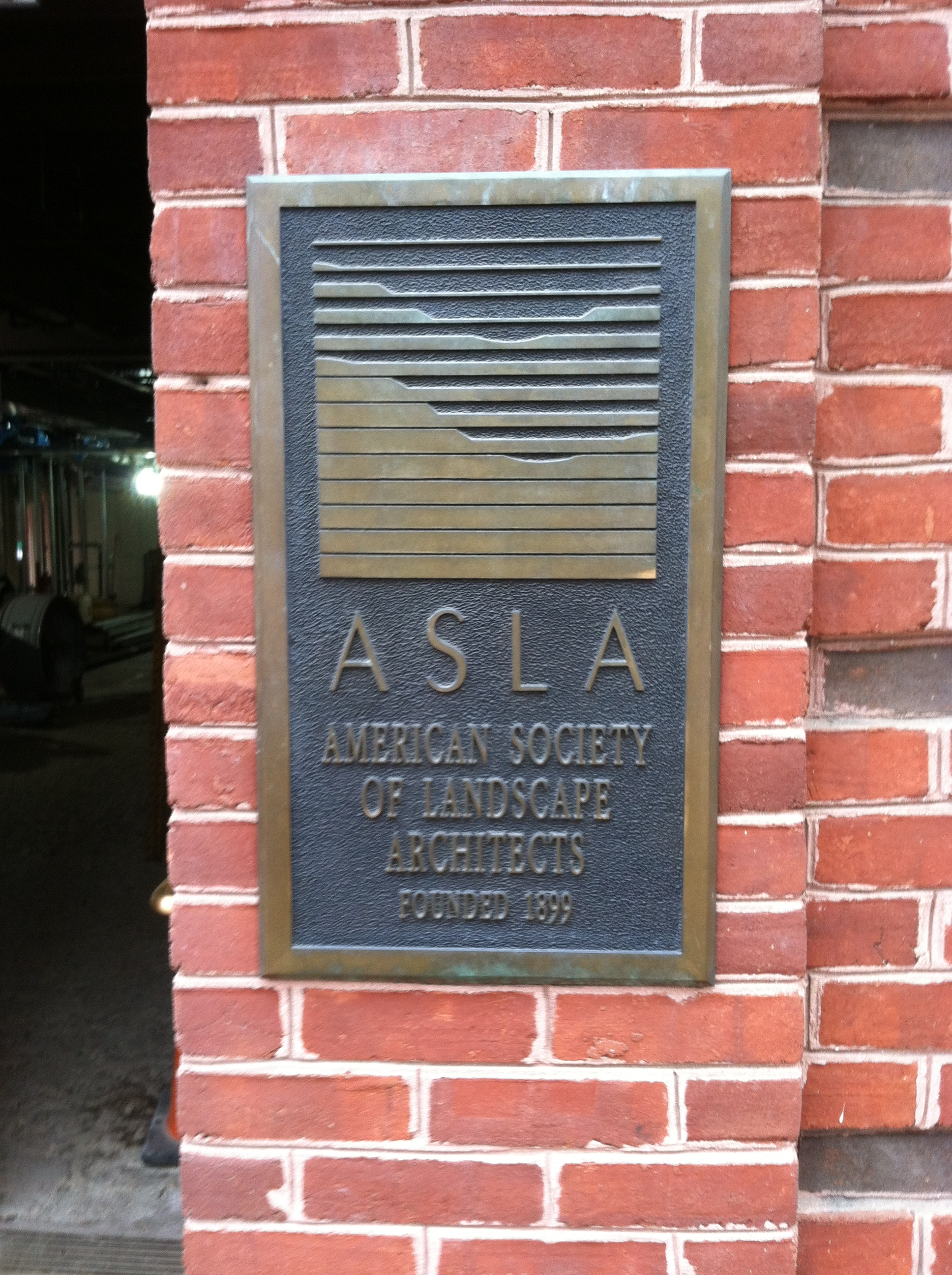
An ASLA plaque at their headquarters in Washington, D.C., in 2016

ASLA was established on January 4, 1899, in New York City by a group of eleven founding members: President John Charles Olmsted, Nathan Franklin Barrett, Beatrix Farrand, Daniel W. Langton, Charles N. Lowrie, Warren H. Manning, Frederick Law Olmsted Jr., Samuel Parsons, George F. Pentecost Jr., Ossian Cole Simonds, and Downing Vaux. In 1960, the headquarters was moved to Washington, D.C.. The first Black member of the ASLA was Charles Edgar Dickinson.

The ASLA bestows various awards annually to professionals and students in the field of landscape architecture for designs and projects. Categories range in size, scale, and type from small residential areas to large parks and waterfronts. Their lifetime achievement award is called the American Society of Landscape Architects Medal.

== Past presidents ==
| Name | Years |
|---|---|
| John Charles Olmsted | 1899–1901 |
| Samuel Parsons | 1901–1902 |
| Nathan Franklin Barrett | 1902–1903 |
| John Charles Olmsted (2) | 1903–1905 |
| Samuel Parsons (2) | 1905–1907 |
| Frederick Law Olmsted Jr. | 1907–1909 |
| Charles N. Lowrie | 1909–1911 |
| Harold A. Caparn | 1911–1912 |
| Ossian Cole Simonds | 1912–1913 |
| Warren H. Manning | 1913–1914 |
| James Sturgis Pray | 1914–1918 |
| Frederick Law Olmsted Jr. (2) | 1918–1922 |
| James Leal Greenleaf | 1922–1927 |
| Arthur Asahel Shurcliff | 1927–1931 |
| Henry Vincent Hubbard | 1931–1935 |
| Albert Davis Taylor | 1935–1941 |
| S. Herbert Hare | 1941–1945 |
| Markley Stevenson | 1945–1949 |
| Gilmore David Clarke | 1949–1951 |
| Lawrence G. Linnard | 1951–1953 |
| Leon Zach | 1953–1957 |
| Norman Newton | 1957–1961 |
| John I. Rogers | 1961–1963 |
| John O. Simonds | 1963–1965 |
| Hubert B. Owens | 1965–1967 |

| Name | Years |
|---|---|
| Theodore Osmundson | 1967–1969 |
| Campbell E. Miller | 1969–1971 |
| Raymond L. Freeman | 1971–1973 |
| William G. Swain | 1973–1974 |
| Owen H. Peters | 1974–1975 |
| Edward H. Stone II | 1975–1976 |
| Benjamin W. Gary Jr. | 1976–1977 |
| Lane L. Marshall | 1977–1978 |
| Jot D. Carpenter | 1978–1979 |
| Robert L. Woerner | 1979–1980 |
| William A. Behnke | 1980–1981 |
| Calvin T. Bishop | 1981–1982 |
| Theodore J. Wirth | 1982–1983 |
| Darwina L. Neal | 1983–1984 |
| Robert H. Mortensen | 1984–1985 |
| John Wacker | 1985–1986 |
| Roger B. Martin | 1986–1987 |
| Cheryl L. Barton | 1987–1988 |
| Brian S. Kubota | 1988–1989 |
| Gerald D. Patten | 1989–1990 |
| Claire R. Bennett | 1990–1991 |
| Cameron R. J. Man | 1991–1992 |
| Debra L. Mitchell | 1992–1993 |
| Thomas P. Papandrew | 1993–1994 |
| Dennis Y. Otsuji | 1994–1995 |

| Name | Years |
|---|---|
| Vincent Bellafiore | 1995–1996 |
| Donald W. Leslie | 1996–1997 |
| Thomas R. Dunbar | 1997–1998 |
| Barry W. Starke | 1998–1999 |
| Janice Cervelli | 1999–2000 |
| Leonard J. Hopper | 2000–2001 |
| Rodney L. Swink | 2001–2002 |
| Paul F. Morris | 2002–2003 |
| Susan L. B. Jacobson | 2003–2004 |
| Patrick A. Miller | 2004–2005 |
| Dennis B. Carmichael | 2005–2006 |
| Patrick W. Caughey | 2006–2007 |
| Perry Howard | 2007–2008 |
| Angela D. Dye | 2008–2009 |
| Gary D. Scott | 2009–2010 |
| Jonathan Mueller | 2010–2011 |
| Susan M. Hatchell | 2011–2012 |
| Thomas R. Tavella | 2012–2013 |
| Mark A. Focht | 2013–2014 |
| K. Richard Zweifel | 2014–2015 |
| Chad D. Danos | 2015–2016 |
| Vaughn B. Rinner | 2016–2017 |
| Gregory A. Miller | 2017–2018 |
| Shawn T. Kelly | 2018–2019 |
| Wendy Miller | 2019–2020 |
| Tom Mroz | 2020–Present |

== See also ==
- Australian Institute of Landscape Architects
- Canadian Society of Landscape Architects
