= List of fellows of the American Academy in Rome (2011–present) =

List of fellows and residents of the American Academy in Rome is a list of those who have been awarded the Rome Prize or were residents of the American Academy in Rome.

The Rome Prize is a prestigious American award made annually by the American Academy in Rome, through a national competition, to 15 emerging artists (working in architecture, landscape architecture, design, historic preservation and conservation, literature, musical composition, or visual arts) and to 15 scholars (working in ancient, medieval, renaissance and early modern, or modern Italian studies). Residents are selected from scholars and creative artists at a further stages in their career for shorter residencies at the American Academy. Some of these residents are marked (R) in the table below.

List of fellows and residents of the American Academy in Rome
1896–1970	1971–1990	1991–2010	2011–present

== Fellows and residents of the American Academy in Rome ==
Year	Category	Winner	Type
2011	Ancient studies	Jackie Murray
2011	Ancient studies	Seth G. Bernard
2011	Ancient studies	M. Shane Bjornlie
2011	Ancient studies	Lauren M. Kinnee
2011	Ancient studies	Andrew M. Riggsby
2011	Ancient studies	Elizabeth C. Robinson
2011	Ancient studies	Tyler T. Travillian
2011	Architecture	Ersela Kripa & Stephen Mueller
2011	Architecture	Joshua G. Stein
2011	Design	Thomas J. Campanella
2011	Design	Jeremy Mende
2011	Design	Adrian Van Allen
2011	Historic preservation & conservation	John Matteo
2011	Historic preservation & conservation	Mark Rabinowitz
2011	Historic preservation & conservation	Laurie W. Rush
2011	Landscape architecture	Casey Lance Brown
2011	Landscape architecture	Fritz Haeg
2011	Literature	Jay Hopler
2011	Literature	Heather McGowan
2011	Medieval studies	Holly Flora
2011	Medieval studies	Carly Jane Steinborn
2011	Modern Italian studies	Stephanie Malia Hom
2011	Modern Italian studies	Jennifer Scappettone
2011	Musical composition	Huck Hodge
2011	Musical composition	Paul Rudy
2011	Renaissance & early modern studies	Kathryn Blair Moore
2011	Renaissance & early modern studies	Stephanie Nadalo
2011	Renaissance & early modern studies	Barbara Naddeo
2011	Renaissance & early modern studies	Michael J. Waters
2011	Visual arts	Dike Blair
2011	Visual arts	Felipe Dulzaides
2011	Visual arts	Sarah Oppenheimer
2011	Visual arts	Karen Yasinsky
2012	Ancient studies	Margaret Marshall Andrews
2012	Ancient studies	Albertus G.A. Horsting
2012	Ancient studies	Elizabeth C. Robinson
2012	Ancient studies	Heidi Wendt
2012	Architecture	Angela Co
2012	Architecture	Lonn Combs
2012	Design	Colin Gee
2012	Design	Jiminie Ha
2012	Historic preservation & conservation	Albert Paul Albano
2012	Historic preservation & conservation	Beatriz del Cueto
2012	Landscape architecture	Sean Lally
2012	Landscape architecture	David Rubin
2012	Literature	Matt Donovan
2012	Literature	Suzanna Rivecca
2012	Medieval studies	Benjamin David Brand
2012	Medieval studies	Jennifer R. Davis
2012	Modern Italian studies	Carly Jane Steinborn
2012	Modern Italian studies	Aaron S. Allen
2012	Modern Italian studies	Paola Bonifazio
2012	Musical composition	Sean Friar
2012	Musical composition	Lei Liang
2012	Renaissance & early modern studies	Bradford Albert Bouley
2012	Renaissance & early modern studies	Craig Martin
2012	Renaissance & early modern studies	Kathryn Blair Moore
2012	Visual arts	Elliott Green
2012	Visual arts	Mary Reid Kelley
2012	Visual arts	Siobhan Liddell
2012	Visual arts	Jenny Snider
2013	Ancient studies	Emma Blake
2013	Ancient studies	Steven J.R. Ellis
2012	Ancient studies	Thomas Hendrickson
2013	Ancient studies	Jennifer Knust
2013	Ancient studies	Brenda Longfellow
2013	Ancient studies	Claudia Moser
2013	Ancient studies	Irene SanPietro
2013	Ancient studies	Denton Alexander Walthall
2013	Architecture	Pablo Castro Estevez
2013	Architecture	William O'Brien Jr.
2013	Design	Erik Adigard
2013	Design	Nicholas Blechman
2013	Historic preservation & conservation	Randall Mason
2013	Historic preservation & conservation	Elizabeth Kaiser Schulte
2013	Historic preservation & conservation	Tom Mayes
2013	Landscape architecture	Ross Benjamin Altheimer
2013	Landscape architecture	Karen M'Closkey
2013	Literature	Lucy Corin
2013	Literature	Jessica Fisher
2013	Medieval studies	Joshua Colin Birk
2013	Modern Italian studies	Camille S. Mathieu
2013	Modern Italian studies	Dominique Kirchner Reill
2013	Modern Italian studies	Beth Saunders
2013	Musical composition	Anthony Cheung
2013	Musical composition	Jesse Jones
2013	Renaissance & early modern studies	Patrick Baker
2013	Renaissance & early modern studies	Peter Jonathan Bell
2013	Renaissance & early modern studies	Mari Yoko Hara
2013	Visual arts	Polly Apfelbaum
2013	Visual arts	Carl D' Alvia
2013	Visual arts	Glendalys Medina
2013	Visual arts	Nari Ward
2014	Ancient studies	Ryan Bailey
2014	Ancient studies	Sheramy D. Bundrick
2014	Ancient studies	Catherine M. Chin
2014	Ancient studies	Stephanie Ann Frampton
2014	Ancient studies	Jessica Nowlin
2014	Ancient studies	Irene San Pietro
2014	Ancient studies	Tracey E. Watts
2014	Architecture	Thomas Kelley
2014	Architecture	Catie Newell
2014	Design	Nicholas de Monchaux
2014	Design	Catherine Wagner
2014	Historic preservation & conservation	Thomas Leslie
2014	Historic preservation & conservation	Thompson M. Mayes
2014	Historic preservation & conservation	Max Page
2014	Landscape architecture	Bradley Cantrell
2014	Landscape architecture	Elizabeth Fain LaBombard
2014	Literature	Peter Bognanni
2014	Literature	Peter Streckfus
2014	Medieval studies	Martin Eisner
2014	Medieval studies	Maya Maskarinec
2014	Medieval studies	Patrick Nold
2014	Modern Italian studies	Lindsay Harris
2014	Modern Italian studies	Ruth W. Lo
2014	Musical composition	Eric Nathan
2014	Musical composition	Dan Visconti
2014	Renaissance & early modern studies	Mari Yoko Hara
2014	Renaissance & early modern studies	Ruth Noyes
2014	Renaissance & early modern studies	Gabrielle Piedad Ponce
2014	Visual arts	Anna Gimon Betbeze
2014	Visual arts	Hamlett Dobbins
2014	Visual arts	Dan Hurlin
2014	Visual arts	Reynold Reynolds
2015	Ancient studies	Ivan Cangemi
2015	Ancient studies	Nathan S. Dennis
2015	Ancient studies	Sarah Levin-Richardson
2015	Ancient studies	Jessica Nowlin
2015	Ancient studies	Sailakshmi Ramgopal
2015	Ancient studies	Heather L. Reid
2015	Architecture	Firat Erdim
2015	Architecture	Vincent L. Snyder
2015	Design	Rob Giampietro
2015	Design	Carin Goldberg
2015	Historic preservation & conservation	John V. Maciuika
2015	Historic preservation & conservation	Anna Serotta
2015	Landscape architecture	Kim Karlsrud & Daniel Philips
2015	Landscape architecture	Adam Kuby
2015	Literature	Krys Lee
2015	Literature	Liz Moore
2015	Medieval studies	Marilynn Desmond
2015	Medieval studies	David Anthony Morris
2015	Modern Italian studies	Denise Rae Constanzo
2015	Modern Italian studies	Ruth W. Lo
2015	Modern Italian studies	Joseph John Viscomi
2015	Musical composition	Andy Akiho
2015	Musical composition	Paula Matthusen
2015	Renaissance & early modern studies	Michelle DiMarzo
2015	Renaissance & early modern studies	Margaret Gaida
2015	Renaissance & early modern studies	Stefania Tutino
2015	Visual arts	Corin Hewitt
2015	Visual arts	Cynthia Madansky
2015	Visual arts	Dave McKenzie
2015	Visual arts	Abinadi Meza
2016	Ancient studies	Nathan S. Dennis
2016	Ancient studies	Katharine P. D. Huemoeller
2016	Ancient studies	Jenny R. Kreiger
2016	Ancient studies	Jeremy B. Lefkowitz
2016	Ancient studies	Mali Annika Skotheim
2016	Ancient studies	Eva M. von Dassow
2016	Architecture	Karl Daubmann
2016	Architecture	Javier Galindo
2016	Design	Lauren Mackler
2016	Design	Woody Pirtle
2016	Historic preservation & conservation	Jeffrey W. Cody
2016	Historic preservation & conservation	Bryony Roberts
2016	Landscape architecture	Christopher Marcinkoski
2016	Landscape architecture	Alexander Robinson
2016	Landscape architecture	Thaisa Way
2016	Literature	Will Boast
2016	Literature	Lysley Tenorio
2016	Medieval studies	Eric Knibbs
2016	Medieval studies	John Lansdowne
2016	Modern Italian studies	Joshua W. Arthurs
2016	Modern Italian studies	Katharine McKenney Johnson
2016	Musical composition	Christopher Cerrone
2016	Musical composition	Nina C. Young
2016	Renaissance & early modern studies	Michelle DiMarzo
2016	Renaissance & early modern studies	Adam Foley
2016	Renaissance & early modern studies	Lauren Jacobi
2016	Renaissance & early modern studies	David E. Karmon
2016	Visual arts	Mark Boulos
2016	Visual arts	Emily Jacir
2016	Visual arts	Senam Okudzeto
2016	Visual arts	David Schutter
2017	Ancient studies	Dorian Borbonus
2017	Ancient studies	Caroline Cheung
2017	Ancient studies	Kevin Dicus
2017	Ancient studies	Andrew Horne
2017	Ancient studies	Jenny R. Kreiger
2017	Ancient studies	Sophie Crawford Waters
2017	Architecture	Phu Hoang & Rachely Rotem
2017	Architecture	Rob Hutchison
2017	Architecture	Yasmin Vobis
2017	Design	Kyle Decamp
2017	Design	David Reinfurt
2017	Historic preservation & conservation	Gregory Bailey
2017	Historic preservation & conservation	Stella Nair
2017	Landscape architecture	Kristi Cheramie
2017	Landscape architecture	Jason Siebenmorgen
2017	Literature	Jack Livings
2017	Literature	Matthew Neill Null
2017	Medieval studies	Hussein Fancy
2017	Medieval studies	John Lansdowne
2017	Medieval studies	Joseph Williams
2017	Modern Italian studies	Jessica Marglin
2017	Modern Italian studies	Danielle Simon
2017	Musical composition	Jonathan Berger
2017	Musical composition	Christopher Trapani
2017	Renaissance & early modern studies	Kathleen Christian
2017	Renaissance & early modern studies	Robert John Clines
2017	Renaissance & early modern studies	Leon P. Grek
2017	Visual arts	E.V. Day
2017	Visual arts	Nicole Miller
2017	Visual arts	Michael Queenland
2017	Visual arts	Enrico Riley
2018	Ancient studies	Michelle L. Berenfeld
2018	Ancient studies	Catherine E. Bonesho
2018	Ancient studies	Liana Brent
2018	Ancient studies	Sophie Crawford-Brown
2018	Ancient studies	Lauren Donovan Ginsberg
2018	Ancient studies	Kevin E. Moch
2018	Architecture	Brandon Clifford
2018	Architecture	Keith Krumwiede
2018	Design	Jennifer Birkeland & Jonathan A. Scelsa
2018	Design	Tricia Treacy
2018	Historic Preservation	Lisa DeLeonardis
2018	Historic Preservation	Liz Ševčenko
2018	Landscape architecture	Alison B. Hirsch & Aroussiak Gabrielian
2018	Landscape architecture	Rosetta S. Elkin
2018	Literature	Ishion Hutchinson
2018	Literature	T. Geronimo Johnson
2018	Medieval studies	Anna Majeski
2018	Medieval studies	Bissera V. Pentcheva
2018	Medieval studies	Joseph Williams
2018	Modern Italian studies	Leslie Cozzi
2018	Modern Italian studies	Diana Garvin
2018	Modern Italian studies	Jessica Gabriel Peritz
2018	Musical composition	Suzanne Farrin
2018	Musical composition	Ashley Fure
2018	Renaissance & Early Modern studies	Raymond Carlson
2018	Renaissance & Early Modern studies	Cécile Fromont
2018	Visual arts	Sanford Biggers
2018	Visual arts	Abigail DeVille
2018	Visual arts	Rochelle Feinstein
2018	Visual arts	Allen Frame
2018	Visual arts	Beverly McIver
2019	Ancient studies	Liana Brent
2019	Ancient studies	Allison L. C. Emmerson
2019	Ancient studies	Eric J. Kondratieff
2019	Ancient studies	Mark Letteney
2019	Ancient studies	Victoria C. Moses
2019	Ancient studies	Sean Tandy
2019	Architecture	Erin Besler
2019	Architecture	Marcel Sanchez Prieto
2019	Design	Dylan Fracareta
2019	Design	Amy Franceschini
2019	Historic preservation & conservation	Joannie Bottkol
2019	Historic preservation & conservation	Lori Wong
2019	Landscape architecture	Zaneta Hong
2019	Landscape architecture	Michael James Saltarella
2019	Literature	Kirstin Valdez Quade
2019	Literature	Bennett Sims
2019	Medieval studies	Anna Majeski
2019	Medieval studies	Austin Powell
2019	Medieval studies	John F. Romano
2019	Modern Italian studies	Franco Baldasso
2019	Modern Italian studies	Jim Carter
2019	Modern Italian studies	Alessandra Ciucci
2019	Musical composition	Michelle Lou
2019	Musical composition	Jessie Marino
2019	Renaissance & early modern studies	Talia Di Manno
2019	Renaissance & early modern studies	Denis J.-J. Robichaud
2019	Visual arts	Michael Ray Charles
2019	Visual arts	Sze Tsung Nicolás Leong
2019	Visual arts	Karyn Olivier
2019	Visual arts	Helen O'Leary
2019	Visual arts	Basil Twist
2020	Ancient Studies	Daniel Diffendale
2020	Ancient Studies	Brian McPhee
2020	Ancient Studies	Victoria C. Moses
2020	Ancient Studies	Jeremy Simmons
2020	Ancient Studies	Christopher van den Berg
2020	Ancient Studies	Rebecca Levitan
2020	Ancient Studies	Parrish Wright
2020	Architecture	Christine Gorby
2020	Architecture	Michael Young
2020	Design	Marsha Ginsberg
2020	Design	Roberto Lugo
2020	Historic Preservation & Conservation	Matthew Brennan
2020	Historic Preservation & Conservation	Ashley Hahn
2020	Landscape Architecture	Brian Davis, PLA
2020	Landscape Architecture	Kate Thomas
2020	Literature	Samiya Bashir
2020	Literature	Nicole Sealey
2020	Medieval Studies	Joel Pattison
2020	Medieval Studies	Alexis Wang
2020	Modern Italian Studies	Fiori Berhane
2020	Modern Italian Studies	Angelo Caglioti
2020	Musical Composition	Courtney Bryan (composer)
2020	Musical Composition	Pamela Z
2020	Renaissance & Early Modern Studies	Evan A. MacCarthy
2020	Renaissance & Early Modern Studies	Alana Mailes
2020	Renaissance & Early Modern Studies	Corey Tazzara
2020	Visual Arts	Garrett Bradley
2020	Visual Arts	David Brooks
2020	Visual Arts	James Casebere
2020	Visual Arts	Sarah Crowner
2020	Visual Arts	John Jesurun
2021	Ancient Studies	Dillon Gisch
2021	Ancient Studies	Maggie Popkin
2021	Ancient Studies	Christy Schirmer
2021	Architecture	Katy Barkan
2021	Architecture	David Serlin
2021	Design	Steven Parker
2021	Design	Terese Wadden
2021	Historic Preservation & Conservation	Jean Dommermuth
2021	Historic Preservation & Conservation	Paulette Marie Singley
2021	Landscape Architecture	Kevin Benham
2021	Landscape Architecture	Robert Gerard Pietrusko
2021	Literature	Alexandra Kleeman
2021	Medieval Studies	Danny Smith
2021	Musical Composition	Katherine Balch
2021	Musical Composition	William Dougherty
2021	Renaissance & Early Modern Studies	Carla Keyvanian
2021	Renaissance & Early Modern Studies	Rebecca Messbarger
2021	Renaissance & Early Modern Studies	Lindsay Sheedy
2021	Visual Arts	Jennifer Packer
2022	Ancient Studies	Sasha-Mae Eccleston
2022	Ancient Studies	Kevin Ennis
2022	Ancient Studies	Kevin Ennis
2022	Ancient Studies	Grace Funsten
2022	Ancient Studies	John Izzo
2022	Ancient Studies	Adriana Maria Vasquez
2022	Architecture	Germane Barnes
2022	Architecture	Mireille Roddier and Keith Mitnick
2022	Design	Mary Ellen Carroll
2022	Design	Jennifer Pastore
2022	Historic Preservation & Conservation	Carol Mancusi-Ungaro
2022	Historic Preservation & Conservation	Sarah Nunberg
2022	Historic Preservation & Conservation	Ellen Pearlstein
2022	Landscape Architecture	Michael Lee
2022	Landscape Architecture	Phoebe Lickwar
2022	Literature	Jessica Hagedorn
2022	Literature	Valzhyna Mort
2022	Medieval Studies	Erene Rafik Morcos
2022	Medieval Studies	Randall Todd Pippenger
2022	Modern Italian Studies	Mary Jane Dempsey
2022	Modern Italian Studies	Elena Past
2022	Modern Italian Studies	SA Smythe
2022	Musical Composition	Igor Santos
2022	Musical Composition	Tina Tallon
2022	Renaissance & Early Modern Studies	Lillian Datchev
2022	Renaissance & Early Modern Studies	Eugenio Refini
2022	Visual Arts	Firelei Báez
2022	Visual Arts	Autumn Knight
2022	Visual Arts	Eric N. Mack
2022	Visual Arts	Daniel Joseph Martinez
2022	Visual Arts	Las Nietas de Nonó
2022	Visual Arts	William Villalongo
2023	Ancient Studies	Sarah Beckmann
2023	Ancient Studies	Emily L. Hurt
2023	Ancient Studies	Evan Jewell
2023	Ancient Studies	Andrew R. Lund
2023	Ancient Studies	Lillian Clare Sellati
2023	Architecture	Michael Meredith and Hilary Sample
2023	Architecture	Jennifer Newsom and Tom Carruthers
2023	Design	John Davis
2023	Design	Jasmine Hearn and Athena Kokoronis
2023	Historic Preservation & Conservation	Preeti Chopra
2023	Historic Preservation & Conservation	Monica Rhodes
2023	Landscape Architecture	Katherine Jenkins and Parker Sutton
2023	Landscape Architecture	Alexa Vaughn
2023	Literature	Gina Apostol
2023	Literature	Jamel Brinkley
2023	Literature	Tung-Hui Hu
2023	Literature	Robyn Schiff
2023	Medieval Studies	Lamia Balafrej
2023	Medieval Studies	Denva E. Gallant
2023	Medieval Studies	Carolyn J. Quijano
2023	Modern Italian Studies	Saskia K. Verlaan
2023	Modern Italian Studies	Konstantina Zanou
2023	Musical Composition	Miya Masaoka
2023	Musical Composition	Christopher Stark
2023	Renaissance & Early Modern Studies	Elizabeth G. Elmi
2023	Renaissance & Early Modern Studies	S. Elizabeth Penry
2023	Renaissance & Early Modern Studies	Stephanie Leitzel
2023	Visual Arts	Tony Cokes
2023	Visual Arts	Todd Gray
2023	Visual Arts	Ester Partegàs
2023	Visual Arts	Elle Pérez
2023	Visual Arts	Ioana M. Uricaru
2023	Visual Arts	Bradford Young
2024	Ancient Studies	Kate Meng Brassel
2024	Ancient Studies	Mary C. Danisi
2024	Ancient Studies	Christopher Erdman
2024	Ancient Studies	Mary-Evelyn Farrior
2024	Ancient Studies	Ryan Haecker
2024	Architecture	César A. Lopez
2024	Architecture	Ajay Manthripragada
2024	Design	David Weeks
2024	Design	Elizabeth Whelan
2024	Historic Preservation & Conservation	Aaron Cayer
2024	Historic Preservation & Conservation	Emily B. Frank
2024	Landscape Architecture	Miranda E. Mote
2024	Landscape Architecture	Lauren Stimson
2024	Literature	Elif Batuman
2023	Literature	Erica Hunt
2024	Literature	Katie Kitamura
2024	Literature	Shruti Swamy
2024	Medieval Studies	Christopher Bonura
2024	Medieval Studies	Dov Honick
2024	Modern Italian Studies	Jessica L. Harris
2024	Modern Italian Studies	Erica Moretti
2024	Modern Italian Studies	Sara L. Petrilli-Jones
2024	Musical Composition	Baldwin Giang
2024	Musical Composition	Kate Soper
2024	Musical Composition	Anthony Vine
2024	Renaissance & Early Modern Studies	Gabriella L. Johnson
2024	Renaissance & Early Modern Studies	Nhung Tuyet Tran
2024	Renaissance & Early Modern Studies	Anne L. Williams
2024	Visual Arts	Kamrooz Aram
2024	Visual Arts	Fatma Bucak
2024	Visual Arts	Nao Bustamante
2024	Visual Arts	Mike Cloud
2024	Visual Arts	Zachery Fabri
2024	Visual Arts	Jeanine Oleson
2024	Visual Arts	Estefania Puerta Grisales
2024	Visual Arts	Dread Scott
2025	Ancient Studies	Brigitte A. Keslinke
2025	Ancient Studies	Emily C. Mitchell
2025	Ancient Studies	Vassiliki Panoussi
2025	Ancient Studies	Crystal Rosenthal
2025	Architecture	Michelle JaJa Chang
2025	Architecture	David Costanza
2025	Design	Amy Revier
2025	Historic Preservation & Conservation	Katherine L. Beaty
2025	Historic Preservation & Conservation	Krupali Krusche
2025	Landscape Architecture	Anthony Acciavatti
2025	Landscape Architecture	Megumi Aihara & Dan Spiegel
2025	Literature	Selby Wynn Schwartz
2025	Literature	Jacob Shores-Argüello
2025	Medieval Studies	Claire Dillon
2025	Medieval Studies	Craig Perry
2025	Modern Italian Studies	Carol E. Harrison
2025	Modern Italian Studies	Lucas R. Ramos
2025	Modern Italian Studies	Giancarlo Tursi
2025	Musical Composition	Jonah Nuoja Luo Haven
2025	Musical Composition	Jen Shyu
2025	Renaissance & Early Modern Studies	Julia Rose Katz
2025	Renaissance & Early Modern Studies	Shannah Rose
2025	Tsao Family Rome Prize	Jenny Lin
2025	Visual Arts	Lex Brown
2025	Visual Arts	Matthew Connors
2025	Visual Arts	Devon Dikeou
2025	Visual Arts	Nona Faustine
2025	Visual Arts	Richard Mosse
2025	Visual Arts	Sheila Pepe
2026	Ancient Studies	Katherine Dennis
2026	Ancient Studies	Paula Gaither
2026	Ancient Studies	Cynthia Liu
2026	Ancient Studies	William Pedrick
2026	Ancient Studies	Darcy Tuttle
2026	Architecture	Akima Brackeen
2026	Architecture	Cory Henry
2026	Design	Heather Scott Peterson
2026	Design	Ginny Sims-Burchard
2026	Environmental Arts and Humanities	Chuna McIntyre
2026	Environmental Arts and Humanities	Sean Mooney
2026	Environmental Arts and Humanities	Katharine Ogle
2026	Environmental Arts and Humanities	Adam Summers
2026	Historic Preservation and Conservation	Claudia Chemello
2026	Historic Preservation and Conservation	Paul Mardikian
2026	Landscape Architecture	Tameka Baba
2026	Landscape Architecture	Sean Burkholder|-
2026	Landscape Architecture	Karen Lutsky
2026	Literature	Maya Binyam
2026	Literature	David Keplinger
2026	Medieval Studies	Nastasya Kosygina
2026	Medieval Studies	John Mulhall
2026	Modern Italian Studies	Charles Leavitt
2026	Modern Italian Studies	Kevin Martín
2026	Musical Composition	Lembit Beecher
2026	Musical Composition	Oswald Huỳnh
2026	Renaissance & Early Modern Studies	Eva Del Soldato
2026	Renaissance & Early Modern Studies	Margo H. Weitzman
2026	Renaissance & Early Modern Studies	Daniel J. Sheridan
2026	Visual Arts	Jennifer Bornstein
2026	Visual Arts	T. J. Dedeaux-Norris
2026	Visual Arts	Andrea Fraser
2026	Visual Arts	Liz Glynn
2026	Visual Arts	Heather Hart
2026	Visual Arts	Jefferson Pinder
