= List of Guggenheim Fellowships awarded in 2009 =

List of Guggenheim Fellowships awarded in 2009: Guggenheim Fellowships have been awarded annually since 1925, by the John Simon Guggenheim Memorial Foundation to those "who have demonstrated exceptional capacity for productive scholarship or exceptional creative ability in the arts."

== U.S., Canadian and Latin America Fellows ==
Fellow	Category	Field of Study
Chris Abani	Creative Arts	Fiction
Mariana Achugar	Social Sciences	Education
Chris Adrian	Creative Arts	Fiction
Guillermo Luis Albanesi	Natural Sciences	Earth Science
Harry Altahír Almela Sánchez	Creative Arts	Poetry
Angela Alonso	Social Sciences	Sociology
Amanda Anderson	Humanities	Intellectual & Cultural History
Michael Ashkin	Creative Arts	Fine Arts
Jabari Asim	Creative Arts	General Nonfiction
Juan Manuel Aurrecoechea Hernández	Humanities	Fine Arts Research
Máximo Bañados	Natural Sciences	Physical Sciences
Ramin Bahrani	Creative Arts	Film
Robert Beachy	Humanities	German & East European History
Fernando Benadon	Creative Arts	Music Composition
Dike Blair	Creative Arts	Fine Arts
Paul Bloodgood	Creative Arts	Fine Arts
Sally Blower	Natural Sciences	Medicine & Health
Eliot Borenstein	Humanities	Slavic Literature
Jeff Bortz	Humanities	Iberian & Latin American History
Thomas L. Bradshaw	Creative Arts	Drama & Performance Art
Thomas Brothers	Humanities	Folklore & Popular Culture
Kate Brown	Humanities	Russian History
Tom Burckhardt	Creative Arts	Fine Arts
Thomas J. Campanella	Humanities	Architecture, Planning, & Design
John Campbell	Humanities	Philosophy
Suzanne Carbonneau	Humanities	Dance Studies
Vincent Carretta	Humanities	American Literature
Omar Carrum Semoloni	Creative Arts	Dance
Verónica Cereceda Bianchi	Social Sciences	Anthropology
Kanchan Chandra	Social Sciences	Political Science
Yu-Hui Chang	Creative Arts	Music Composition
Constance J. Chang-Hasnain	Natural Sciences	Engineering
Billy Childs	Creative Arts	Music Composition
Nancy Chunn	Creative Arts	Fine Arts
Margaret Cogswell	Creative Arts	Fine Arts
Ryan Cohan	Creative Arts	Music Composition
Paul Collins	Creative Arts	General Nonfiction
Janet M. Conrad	Natural Sciences	Physics
Richard M. Cook	Humanities	American Literature
Thomas Joshua Cooper	Creative Arts	Photography
Livia Corona	Creative Arts	Photography
Miguel Coyula	Creative Arts	Film and Video
Stacey D'Erasmo	Creative Arts	Fiction
Veena Das	Social Sciences	Anthropology & Cultural Studies
Sebastian Diaz Morales	Creative Arts	Film and Video
Fernanda G. De Felice	Natural Sciences	Molecular & Cellular Biology
Paul Desenne	Creative Arts	Music Composition
Evgeny A. Dobrenko	Humanities	Slavic Literature
Frances E. Dolan	Humanities	English Literature
Martin Doyle	Social Sciences	Geography & Environmental Studies
Patrick Doyle	Natural Sciences	Engineering
R. Lawrence Edwards	Natural Sciences	Earth Science
Danae Elon	Creative Arts	Film
Caryl Emerson	Humanities	Slavic Literature
Carl W. Ernst	Humanities	Translation
Jianqing Fan	Natural Sciences	Statistics
Walter M. Farina	Natural Sciences	Organismic Biology & Ecology
Denis Feeney	Humanities	Classics
Ellen Feldman	Creative Arts	Fiction
Jennifer Fewell	Natural Sciences	Organismic Biology & Ecology
Francesca Fiorani	Humanities	Fine Arts Research
Susan T. Fiske	Social Sciences	Psychology
Frances FitzGerald	Creative Arts	General Nonfiction
Athanassios Fokas	Natural Sciences	Applied Mathematics
Pierre Force	Humanities	French Literature
Gabriela Lena Frank	Creative Arts	Music Composition
Peter Galison	Humanities	History of Science & Technology
Joshua Gamson	Humanities	Folklore & Popular Culture
Erin Gee	Creative Arts	Music Composition
Kathryn Linn Geurts	Social Sciences	Anthropology & Cultural Studies
John A. Glusman	Creative Arts	General Nonfiction
Howard Goldblatt	Humanities	Translation
George D. Gollin	Creative Arts	General Nonfiction
Risa L. Goluboff	Social Sciences	Constitutional Studies
Flávio dos Santos Gomes	Humanities	History
Michael Gordon	Creative Arts	Music Composition
Annette Gordon-Reed	Humanities	United States History
Amy S. Greenberg	Humanities	United States History
Laura H. Greene	Natural Sciences	Physics
Susan Griffin	Creative Arts	General Nonfiction
Jennifer M. Groh	Natural Sciences	Neuroscience
Steven S. Gubser	Natural Sciences	Physics
Mario Eduardo Guido	Natural Sciences	Neuroscience
Richard Halpern	Humanities	English Literature
Karen Halttunen	Humanities	United States History
Saskia Hamilton	Creative Arts	Poetry
Alice C. Harris	Humanities	Linguistics
Joseph Harrison	Creative Arts	Poetry
Jordan Harrison	Creative Arts	Drama & Performance Art
John Haskell	Creative Arts	Fiction
Terrance Hayes	Creative Arts	Poetry
Lyn Hejinian	Creative Arts	Poetry
Heather Hendershot	Humanities	Film, Video, & Radio Studies
Robin Marantz Henig	Natural Sciences	Science Writing
Lynn Hershman Leeson	Creative Arts	Film
Benjamin Carter Hett	Humanities	German & East European History
Henry Hills	Creative Arts	Film
Rodolfo Hinostroza	Creative Arts	Poetry
Evelyne Huber	Social Sciences	Political Science
Alberto A. Iglesias	Natural Sciences	Molecular & Cellular Biology
Sanford M. Jacoby	Social Sciences	Economics
Ken Kalfus	Creative Arts	Fiction
Laura Kasischke	Creative Arts	Poetry
Sam Kauffmann	Creative Arts	Film
John N. King	Humanities	Bibliography
Marshall N. Klimasewiski	Creative Arts	Fiction
Marcelo Knobel	Natural Sciences	Physical Sciences
Artyom Kopp	Natural Sciences	Molecular & Cellular Biology
Heidi Kumao	Creative Arts	Video & Audio
Paul Laffoley	Creative Arts	Fine Arts
Barbara Landau	Social Sciences	Psychology
Richard Lange	Creative Arts	Fiction
Jaime R. Lara	Humanities	Fine Arts Research
Deborah Lawrence	Natural Sciences	Plant Sciences
Thomas Lawson	Creative Arts	Fine Arts
Zachary Lazar	Creative Arts	Fiction
Zachary Leader	Creative Arts	Biography
Edson Roberto Leite	Natural Sciences	Chemistry
Ralph Lemon	Creative Arts	Choreography
Noel Lenski	Humanities	Classics
Theodore J. Lewis	Humanities	Religion
Lei Liang	Creative Arts	Music Composition
Paul Etienne Lincoln	Creative Arts	Fine Arts
Julia Loktev	Creative Arts	Film
Medrie MacPhee	Creative Arts	Fine Arts
Lenore Malen	Creative Arts	Fine Arts
Joanna Malinowska	Creative Arts	Fine Arts
Iñigo Manglano-Ovalle	Creative Arts	Fine Arts
Charles R. Marsh	Creative Arts	Biography
Roderick A. McDonald	Humanities	Iberian & Latin American History
Margaret McFall-Ngai	Natural Sciences	Organismic Biology & Ecology
Jeff McMahan	Humanities	Philosophy
Diane McWhorter	Creative Arts	General Nonfiction
Julia Meltzer	Creative Arts	Film
Sarah Michelson	Creative Arts	Choreography
Susan Middleton	Natural Sciences	Science Writing
L. Scott Mills	Natural Sciences	Organismic Biology & Ecology
Robert A. Moffitt	Social Sciences	Economics
Udayan Mohanty	Natural Sciences	Chemistry
Ingrid Monson	Humanities	African Studies
Tamar Muskal	Creative Arts	Music Composition
Osamu James Nakagawa	Creative Arts	Photography
Priyamvada Natarajan	Natural Sciences	Astronomy - Astrophysics
Fae Myenne Ng	Creative Arts	Fiction
Mae M. Ngai	Humanities	United States History
Tara Nummedal	Humanities	History of Science & Technology
Suzanne Opton	Creative Arts	Photography
Eve Ostriker	Natural Sciences	Astronomy - Astrophysics
Chuck Owen	Creative Arts	Music Composition
Elías José Palti	Social Sciences	Political Science
Arturo Pérez Torres	Creative Arts	Film
Rolando Peña	Creative Arts	Fine Arts
Leslie P. Peirce	Humanities	Near Eastern Studies
Carlos Enrique Peruzzotti	Social Sciences	Political Science
Carla Gardina Pestana	Humanities	British History
Andrew X. Pham	Creative Arts	General Nonfiction
Juan Carlos Quintero Herencia	Humanities	Literary Studies
W. G. Raad	Creative Arts	Fine Arts
Maria Clemencia Ramírez	Social Sciences	Anthropology
Angela Cecilia Ramírez Sanz	Creative Arts	Fine Arts
Barbara Ras	Creative Arts	Poetry
Alexander Rehding	Humanities	Music Research
Kelly Reichardt	Creative Arts	Film
Wadda C. Rios-Font	Humanities	Latin American Literature
Lisa Rodensky	Humanities	Literary Criticism
Adriana Rodríguez-Pérsico	Humanities	Literary Studies
Tamar Rogoff	Creative Arts	Choreography
Victoria Sanford	Humanities	Iberian & Latin American History
Renato de Lima Santos	Natural Sciences	Medicine & Health
Mayra Santos-Febres	Humanities	Fiction
Wilhelm Schlag	Natural Sciences	Mathematics
Jonathan H. Shannon	Social Sciences	Anthropology & Cultural Studies
Anna Shteynshleyger	Creative Arts	Photography
Mark P. Simmons	Natural Sciences	Plant Sciences
George Singleton	Creative Arts	Fiction
Joseph R. Slaughter	Humanities	Literary Criticism
Wadada Leo Smith	Creative Arts	Music Composition
Robert Courtney Smith	Social Sciences	Sociology
Stephanie Snider	Creative Arts	Fine Arts
Jacob Soll	Humanities	Intellectual & Cultural History
Federico Solmi	Creative Arts	Video & Audio
Lisa Russ Spaar	Creative Arts	Poetry
Jered Sprecher	Creative Arts	Fine Arts
Cheryle St. Onge	Creative Arts	Photography
John D. Stephens	Social Sciences	Political Science
Jessica Eve Stern	Creative Arts	General Nonfiction
Georg F. Striedter	Natural Sciences	Neuroscience
Daniel Z. Sui	Social Sciences	Geography & Environmental Studies
Jeannie Suk	Social Sciences	Law
Larissa Szporluk	Creative Arts	Poetry
Demetri Terzopoulos	Natural Sciences	Computer Science
David Thorne	Creative Arts	Film
Daniel Tobin	Creative Arts	Poetry
Shirley Tse	Creative Arts	Fine Arts
Nick Turse	Creative Arts	General Nonfiction
Brian Ulrich	Creative Arts	Photography
María de la Luz Urriola González	Creative Arts	Poetry
Alejandro José Vila	Natural Sciences	Chemistry
David J. Wallace	Humanities	Medieval Literature
Anne Washburn	Creative Arts	Drama & Performance Art
Susan Cotts Watkins	Social Sciences	Sociology
Anna Weesner	Creative Arts	Music Composition
Jeff Wheelwright	Creative Arts	General Nonfiction
Deborah Gray White	Humanities	United States History
Faith Wilding	Creative Arts	Fine Arts
Pamela Helena Wilson	Creative Arts	Fine Arts
Byron Wolfe	Creative Arts	Photography
Linda Wordeman	Natural Sciences	Molecular & Cellular Biology
Alexi Worth	Creative Arts	Fine Arts
Yasuko Yokoshi	Creative Arts	Choreography
Muhammad Qasim Zaman	Humanities	Religion
Oscar Adolfo Zanetti Lecuona	Humanities	History
Shou-Wu Zhang	Natural Sciences	Mathematics
Jawole Willa Jo Zollar	Creative Arts	Choreography
