= Steven Ellis =

Steven or Steve Ellis may refer to:

- Steve Ellis (comics) (born 1971), American comic book artist and illustrator
- Steve Ellis (musician) (1950–2026), English singer
- Steve Ellis (literary scholar) (born 1952), British literary scholar and poet
- Steve Ellis (rower) (born 1968), British lightweight rower
- Steven J. R. Ellis (born 1974), Australian archaeologist

== See also ==
- Stephen Ellis (disambiguation)
