= Steve Parker (artist) =

American sound artist and sculptor

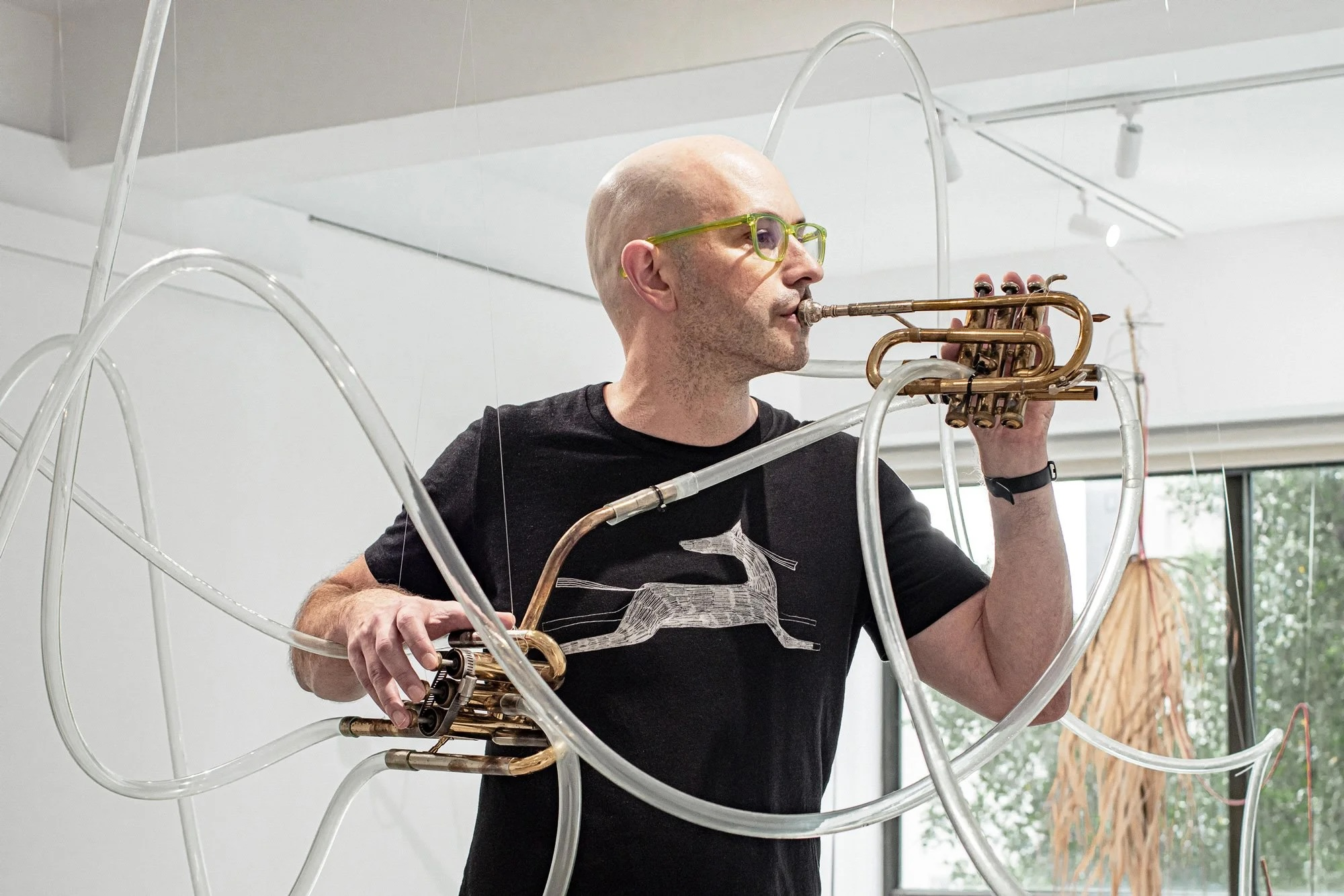
- Parker in 2025
- Born: Downers Grove, Illinois, United States
- Education: Oberlin College (BA, BM), Rice University (MM), University of Texas at Austin (DMA)
- Known for: Sound art, sculpture, interactive installation, public art, performance, music composition
- Awards: Rome Prize, Creative Capital Award, Texas State Artist
- Website: steve-parker.net

Steve Parker is an American sound artist, sculptor, musician, and composer based in Austin, Texas. His sculptures and performances explore listening as a way of connecting people with one another, other species, and the landscape.

Parker received a 2020–21 Rome Prize and a 2025 Creative Capital Award. He was designated the 2025 Texas State Three-Dimensional Artist.

== Early life and education ==
Parker was born in Downers Grove, Illinois, and grew up in several places, including Oak Park. His mother is Lebanese. He graduated from Oberlin College and Conservatory in 2002 with degrees in mathematics and trombone performance. At Oberlin, he also pursued interests in computer programming and neural networks. He subsequently earned a Master of Music from Rice University and a Doctor of Musical Arts from the University of Texas at Austin.

== Career and work ==
Parker works with salvaged musical instruments, acoustic devices, and recording technologies. His installations include wearable listening devices and sculptures activated by visitors. His participatory performances combine musicians and community groups with environmental sounds, including the calls of urban wildlife. His phonograph works use wood as a recording surface, linking sound playback with the material changes of a dead tree.

In its presentation of Futurist Listening, CUE Art Foundation connected Parker's work to the listening philosophies of Pauline Oliveros and John Cage, emphasizing the role of the listener in activating and interpreting sound.

In her catalogue essay for Futurist Listening, art historian Lilia Rocio Taboada situated Parker's practice within the traditions of Fluxus, Happenings, and performance art. She described his use of repurposed instruments and early sound technologies as extending those participatory traditions, and examined how his wearable sculptures adapted military acoustic devices for intimate listening.

=== Experimental music and participatory performances ===
Parker held a Fulbright fellowship in Germany in 2004–2005, studying experimental brass performance and developing works involving video and electronics.

As a solo trombonist and member of Ensemble Signal, he has premiered more than 200 compositions. He has performed at the Lucerne Festival, Lincoln Center Festival, MASS MoCA, and Tanglewood.

Alongside his work as a performer, Parker curated SoundSpace, a performance series at the Blanton Museum of Art that began in 2011. The series placed musicians throughout the museum, allowing visitors to move between performances.

In Bat/Man (2016), Parker brought together amplified bat calls, a conch shell ensemble, a megaphone choir, and handmade echolocation devices near Austin's Congress Avenue Bridge bat colony. The work was presented at the Fusebox Festival. Ethnomusicologist Julianne Graper analyzed the work in Sound Studies in relation to echolocation and human–animal relationships.

For Grackle Call (2018), also presented at Fusebox, Parker organized an audiovisual performance as an urban bird-watching tour. Participants used binoculars, audio players, and maps to encounter performances and installations addressing Austin's relationship with grackles.

=== Listening sculptures ===
Futurist Listening, an exhibition of listening sculptures curated by Marcela Guerrero, was presented at CUE Art Foundation in New York from January 9 to February 12, 2020. It included sonic headwear, brass-instrument sculptures, and graphic scores drawing on military uses of sound, including coded messages, jamming, and warning sirens. In Ghost Box, visitors touched sections of a brass sculpture to activate recorded sounds through headphones. ASMR Étude used wearable acoustic devices modeled on military sound locators to play recorded voices and static. Reviewing the exhibition for Design Milk, David Behringer discussed the contrast between the sculptures' playful interactions and their references to wartime communication and deception. An exhibition of Futurist Listening at Rich Mix in London was curated by Melanie Lenz.

In 2021, Parker held the Cynthia Hazen Polsky and Leon Polsky Rome Prize at the American Academy in Rome from January to June. His project, Futurist Opera, proposed instruments, sound suits, and graphic scores for participatory performance.

During the residency, Parker presented Human Stylus, Sanctus, and Death Rattle in Aluminum Forest, an outdoor program at the American Academy in Rome's Villa Aurelia. Human Stylus was a procession of wearable listening devices controlled by their users. Sanctus combined acoustic mirrors, salvaged brass, birdsong, and a chant by Hildegard of Bingen, while Death Rattle used ultrasound recordings of the body.

=== Automated instruments and sonic meditations ===
Art League Houston presented Fight Song from December 16, 2022, to February 11, 2023. The exhibition paired automated sculptures made from salvaged marching band instruments with videos of a college marching band performing sonic meditations. Art League Houston described the project in relation to healing, injury, and labor in football, connecting it with Oliveros's Deep Listening practice, Anthony Braxton's marching bands, and Guadalupe Maravilla's Disease Thrower sculptures.

The Blanton Museum of Art presented Weird Winter from December 9, 2023, to January 7, 2024. The installation used modified snow globes accompanied by music from The Nutcracker and motion-activated mechanisms that moved tree branches carrying bells.

The Sonic Meditation for Solo Performer series gives an individual visitor a role in generating the installation's sound. The visitor wears an electroencephalography (EEG) headset and reads meditation prompts; software uses the measurements to generate a 16-part composition played through suspended brass instruments.

In 2025, Parker was a visiting scholar at National Taiwan University as a Fulbright Senior Scholar researching hybrid musical instruments and Taiwanese instrument craftsmanship.

Sheng Rebirth (笙聲生) was exhibited at King Car Cultural & Art Center in Taipei from July 24 to August 3, 2025. Parker assembled discarded sheng mouth organs, guzheng, and ruan instruments with dried plants, small motors, and recordings of tree frogs to create playable sculptures.

SPACES in Cleveland presented Fight Song from February 13 to April 18, 2026, incorporating an EEG-controlled installation, marching band videos, and performances by regional artists. In a review for CAN Journal, Paul Cox described experimenting with the installation's sound through breathing, concentration, and conversation.

=== Public art ===
In 2019, KMFA commissioned Sound Garden, a long-term installation for its new Austin facility. The project was conceived as groups of interactive sound sculptures using salvaged instruments, organ pipes, electronics, and amplified plants.

Foghorn Elegy, a site-specific sound sculpture at Laguna Gloria, was presented in October 2021 as part of a program of seasonal artist projects at The Contemporary Austin.

Invisible Music (2024), commissioned for City Place in Spring, Texas, placed sculptures made from brass instruments on floating platforms in a pond, alongside interactive works on the surrounding grounds. The soundscape adapted Erik Satie's Furniture Music and incorporated recordings of insects, birds, and bats.

In 2025, Austin's Art in Public Places panel and Arts Commission endorsed Parker for an arrivals curbside public art commission at Austin–Bergstrom International Airport.

=== Phonographs, memory, and landscape ===
Funeral for a Tree brought together wooden records, instruments, and medical airflow devices in an exhibition about memory and loss. It was presented at Ivester Contemporary in Austin from November 29, 2025, to January 10, 2026. He used the remains of a 65-year-old live oak that had died of oak wilt to make playable records and sound sculptures. The records carried interpretations of birdsong played on the sheng by Taiwanese musician Jipo Yang. A wooden phonograph modeled on a Victrola used a toothpick as its stylus to play a record of Ernest Thompson's 1924 performance of "Bury Me Beneath the Willow".

Other sculptures combined salvaged shengs, wood, medical ventilators, and continuous positive airway pressure (CPAP) machines, using mechanical airflow to sound the instruments. Parker connected the tree's illness with memories of his father's illness and death from cancer in interviews about the exhibition. He also linked the fading sound of the wooden records as they dried and cracked to the deterioration of memory.

Parker's work on landscape and environmental change also includes Houston Is Sinking, supported by a 2025 Creative Capital Award. The proposed project addresses land subsidence through sound sculptures made from obsolete navigational devices and a community foghorn performance.

== Teaching and arts administration ==
Parker is the artistic director of COLLIDE Arts, an Austin nonprofit arts organization. He is also a professor of instruction in music at the University of Texas at San Antonio. His teaching includes trombone, sound art, new media, and music business.

== Awards and recognition ==
- 2018: Tito's Prize, Big Medium.
- 2020: Ashurst Emerging Artist Prize, New Media category.
- 2020–21: Rome Prize, American Academy in Rome.
- 2023: Pollock-Krasner Foundation grant.
- 2023: McKnight Visiting Composer Residency, American Composers Forum.
- 2024: Asian Cultural Council fellowship for research and exchange in Taiwan.
- 2025: Creative Capital Award.
- 2025: Texas State Three-Dimensional Artist.
- 2025: Harpo Foundation Grant for Visual Artists.

== Partial discography ==
- Shelter, by Michael Gordon, David Lang, and Julia Wolfe, performed by Ensemble Signal (Cantaloupe Music, 2013).
- Nearly Extinct, with Henry Kaiser, Damon Smith, and Chris Cogburn (Balance Point Acoustics, 2016).
