= Ode to Joy =

Ode (poem) by Friedrich Schiller

- by Friedrich Schiller
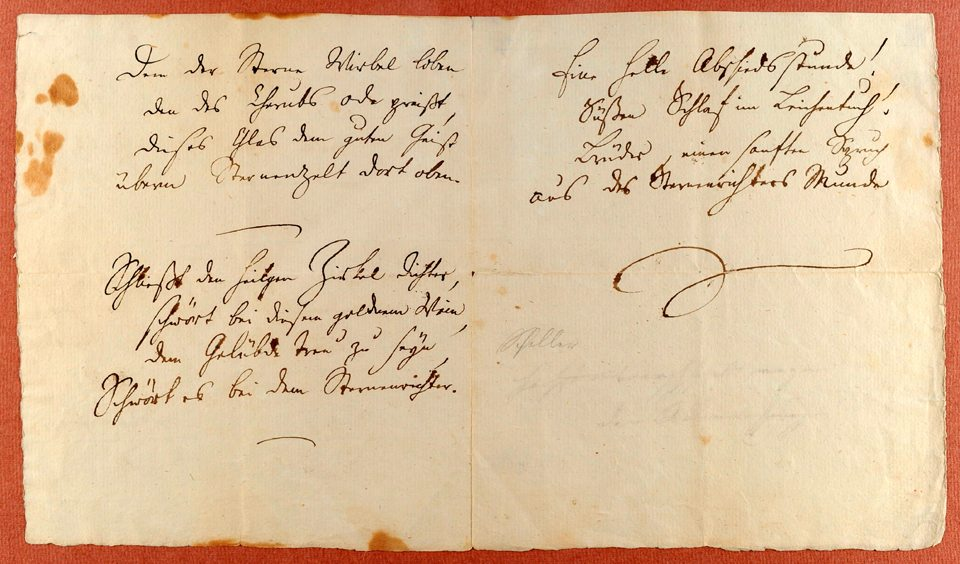
- Autograph manuscript, c. 1785
- Original title: An die Freude
- Written: 1785
- Country: Germany
- Language: German
- Form: Ode
- Publisher: Thalia
- Publication date: 1786, 1808

"Ode to Joy" (German: "An die Freude" [an diː ˈfʁɔʏdə]) is an ode written in the summer of 1785 by the German poet, playwright, and historian Friedrich Schiller. It was published the following year in the German magazine Thalia. In 1808, a slightly revised version changed two lines of the first stanza and omitted the last stanza.

"Ode to Joy" is best known for its use by Ludwig van Beethoven in the final (fourth) movement of his Ninth Symphony, completed in 1824. Beethoven's text is not based entirely on Schiller's poem, and it introduces a few new sections. Beethoven's melody, but not Schiller's text, was adopted as the "Anthem of Europe" by the Council of Europe in 1972 and later by the European Union. Rhodesia's national anthem from 1974 until 1979, "Rise, O Voices of Rhodesia", also used Beethoven's melody.

== The poem ==
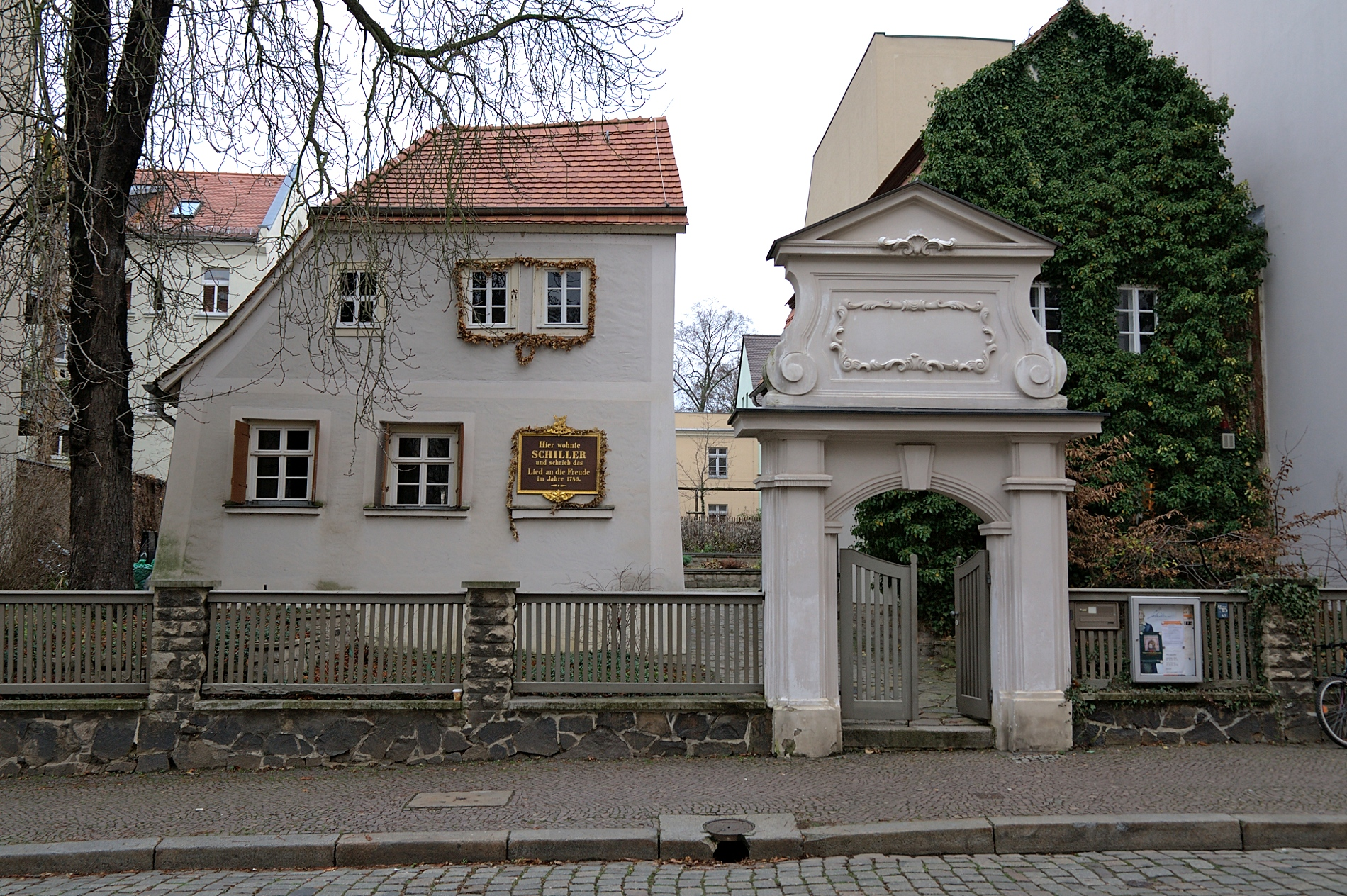
Schillerhaus in Gohlis

Schiller wrote the first version of the poem when he was staying in Gohlis, Leipzig. In 1785, from the beginning of May until mid-September, he stayed with his publisher, Georg Joachim Göschen, in Leipzig and wrote "An die Freude" along with his play Don Carlos.

Schiller later made some revisions to the poem, which was then republished posthumously in 1808, and it was this latter version that forms the basis for Beethoven's setting. Despite the lasting popularity of the ode, Schiller himself regarded it as a failure later in his life, going so far as to call it "detached from reality" and "of value maybe for us two, but not for the world, nor for the art of poetry" in an 1800 letter to his longtime friend and patron Christian Gottfried Körner (whose friendship had originally inspired him to write the ode).

=== Lyrics ===
An die Freude

Freude, schöner Götterfunken,
Tochter aus Elysium,
Wir betreten feuertrunken,
Himmlische, dein Heiligtum.
Deine Zauber binden wieder,
Was die Mode streng geteilt,*
Alle Menschen werden Brüder,*
Wo dein sanfter Flügel weilt.

Seid umschlungen Millionen!
Diesen Kuß der ganzen Welt!
Brüder — überm Sternenzelt
Muß ein lieber Vater wohnen.

Wem der große Wurf gelungen,
Eines Freundes Freund zu sein,
Wer ein holdes Weib errungen,
Mische seinen Jubel ein!
Ja — wer auch nur eine Seele
Sein nennt auf dem Erdenrund!
Und wer's nie gekonnt, der stehle
Weinend sich aus diesem Bund!

Was den großen Ring bewohnet
Huldige der Sympathie!
Zu den Sternen leitet sie,
Wo der Unbekannte thronet.

Freude trinken alle Wesen
An den Brüsten der Natur,
Alle Guten, alle Bösen
Folgen ihrer Rosenspur.
Küsse gab sie uns und Reben,
Einen Freund, geprüft im Tod,
Wollust ward dem Wurm gegeben,
Und der Cherub steht vor Gott.

Ihr stürzt nieder, Millionen?
Ahnest du den Schöpfer Welt?
Such ihn überm Sternenzelt,
Über Sternen muß er wohnen.

Freude heißt die starke Feder
In der ewigen Natur.
Freude, Freude treibt die Räder
In der großen Weltenuhr.
Blumen lockt sie aus den Keimen,
Sonnen aus dem Firmament,
Sphären rollt sie aus den Räumen,
Die des Sehers Rohr nicht kennt.

Froh, wie seine Sonnen fliegen
Durch des Himmels prächt'gen Plan,
Wandelt Brüder eure Bahn,
Freudig wie ein Held zum Siegen.

Aus der Wahrheit Feuerspiegel
Lächelt sie den Forscher an.
Zu der Tugend steilem Hügel
Leitet sie des Dulders Bahn.
Auf des Glaubens Sonnenberge
Sieht man ihre Fahnen wehn,
Durch den Riß gesprengter Särge
Sie im Chor der Engel stehn.

Duldet mutig Millionen!
Duldet für die beßre Welt!
Droben überm Sternenzelt
Wird ein großer Gott belohnen.

Göttern kann man nicht vergelten,
Schön ist ihnen gleich zu sein.
Gram und Armut solln sich melden,
Mit den Frohen sich erfreun.
Groll und Rache sein vergessen,
Unserm Todfeind sei verziehn,
Keine Träne soll ihn pressen,
Keine Reue nage ihn.

Unser Schuldbuch sei vernichtet,
Ausgesöhnt die ganze Welt!
Brüder — überm Sternenzelt
Richtet Gott wie ihr gerichtet.

Freude sprudelt in Pokalen,
In der Traube goldnem Blut
Trinken Sanftmut Kannibalen,
Die Verzweiflung Heldenmut.
Brüder fliegt von euren Sitzen,
Wenn der volle Römer kreist,
Laßt den Schaum zum Himmel spritzen:
Dieses Glas dem guten Geist!

Den der Sterne Wirbel loben,
Den des Seraphs Hymne preist,
Dieses Glas dem guten Geist,
Überm Sternenzelt dort droben!

Festen Mut in schweren Leiden,
Hilfe, wo die Unschuld weint,
Ewigkeit geschwornen Eiden,
Wahrheit gegen Freund und Feind,
Männerstolz vor Königsthronen,
Brüder, gält es Gut und Blut!
Dem Verdienste seine Kronen,
Untergang der Lügenbrut!

Schließt den heil'gen Zirkel dichter,
Schwört bei diesem goldnen Wein,
Dem Gelübde treu zu sein,
Schwört es bei dem Sternenrichter!

Rettung von Tyrannenketten,
Großmut auch dem Bösewicht,
Hoffnung auf den Sterbebetten,
Gnade auf dem Hochgericht!
Auch die Toten sollen leben!
Brüder, trinkt und stimmet ein,
Allen Sündern soll vergeben,
Und die Hölle nicht mehr sein.

Eine heitre Abschiedsstunde!
Süßen Schlaf im Leichentuch!
Brüder — einen sanften Spruch
Aus des Totenrichters Mund.

Translation:

Ode to Joy

Joy, thou beauteous godly lightning,
Daughter of Elysium,
Fire drunken we are ent'ring
Heavenly, thy holy home!
Thy enchantments bind together,
What did custom stern divide,
Every man becomes a brother,
Where thy gentle wings abide.

Chorus.
Be embrac'd, ye millions yonder!
Take this kiss throughout the world!
Brothers — o'er the stars unfurl'd
Must reside a loving Father.

Who the noble prize achieveth,
Good friend of a friend to be;
Who a lovely wife attaineth,
Join us in his jubilee!
Yes — he too who but one being
On this earth can call his own!
He who ne'er was able, weeping
Stealeth from this league alone!

Chorus.
He who in the great ring dwelleth,
Homage pays to sympathy!
To the stars above leads she,
Where on high the Unknown reigneth.

Joy is drunk by every being
From kind nature's flowing breasts,
Every evil, every good thing
For her rosy footprint quests.
Gave she us both vines and kisses,
In the face of death a friend,
To the worm were given blisses
And the Cherubs God attend.

Chorus.
Fall before him, all ye millions?
Know'st thou the Creator, world?
Seek above the stars unfurl'd,
Yonder dwells He in the heavens.

Joy commands the hardy mainspring
Of the universe eterne.
Joy, oh joy the wheel is driving
Which the worlds' great clock doth turn.
Flowers from the buds she coaxes,
Suns from out the hyaline,
Spheres she rotates through expanses,
Which the seer can't divine.

Chorus.
As the suns are flying, happy
Through the heaven's glorious plane,
Travel, brothers, down your lane,
Joyful as in hero's vict'ry.

From the truth's own fiery mirror
On the searcher doth she smile.
Up the steep incline of honor
Guideth she the suff'rer's mile.
High upon faith's sunlit mountains
One can see her banner flies,
Through the breach of open'd coffins
She in angel's choir doth rise.

Chorus.
Suffer on courageous millions!
Suffer for a better world!
O'er the tent of stars unfurl'd
God rewards you from the heavens.

Gods can never be requited,
Beauteous 'tis, their like to be.
Grief and want shall be reported,
So to cheer with gaiety.
Hate and vengeance be forgotten,
Pardon'd be our mortal foe,
Not a teardrop shall him dampen,
No repentance bring him low.

Chorus.
Let our book of debts be cancell'd!
Reconcile the total world!
Brothers — o'er the stars unfurl'd
God doth judge, as we have settl'd.

Joy doth bubble from this rummer,
From the golden blood of grape
Cannibals imbibe good temper,
Weak of heart their courage take —
Brothers, fly up from thy places,
When the brimming cup doth pass,
Let the foam shoot up in spaces:
To the goodly Soul this glass!

Chorus.
Whom the crown of stars doth honor,
Whom the hymns of Seraphs bless,
To the goodly Soul this glass
O'er the tent of stars up yonder!

Courage firm in grievous trial,
Help, where innocence doth scream,
Oaths which sworn to are eternal,
Truth to friend and foe the same,
Manly pride 'fore kingly power —
Brothers, cost it life and blood —
Honor to whom merits honor,
Ruin to the lying brood!

Chorus.
Closer draw the holy circle,
Swear it by this golden wine,
Faithful to the vow divine,
Swear it by the Judge celestial!

Rescue from the tyrant's fetters,
Mercy to the villain e'en,
Hope within the dying hours,
Pardon at the guillotine!
E'en the dead shall live in heaven!
Brothers, drink and all agree,
Every sin shall be forgiven,
Hell forever cease to be.

Chorus.
A serene departing hour!
Pleasant sleep beneath the pall!
Brothers — gentle words for all
Doth the Judge of mortals utter!

==== Revisions ====
The lines marked with * were revised in the posthumous 1808 edition as follows:

Original	Revised	Translation of original	Translation of revision	Comment
was der Mode Schwerd geteilt	Was die Mode streng geteilt	what the sword of custom divided	What custom strictly divided	The original meaning of Mode was "custom, contemporary taste".
Bettler werden Fürstenbrüder	Alle Menschen werden Brüder	beggars become princes' brothers	All people become brothers	

The original, later eliminated last stanza reads

Rettung von Tirannenketten,
Großmut auch dem Bösewicht,
Hoffnung auf den Sterbebetten,
Gnade auf dem Hochgericht!
Auch die Toden sollen leben!
Brüder trinkt und stimmet ein,
Allen Sündern soll vergeben,
und die Hölle nicht mehr seyn.

Translation:

Rescue the chained from the despot,
Kindness to the wicked too,
Let hope come in on the deathbed,
Mercy in the high courts too,
Let the dead be resurrected,
Brothers, join with me and drink
That us sinners hence be absolved
Satan’s plight’s what I bethink.

==== Ode to Freedom ====
Academic speculation remains as to whether Schiller originally wrote an "Ode to Freedom" (An die Freiheit) and changed it to "To Joy". The American journalist Alexander Wheelock Thayer wrote in his biography of Beethoven, "the thought lies near that it was the early form of the poem, when it was still an 'Ode to Freedom' (not 'to Joy'), which first aroused enthusiastic admiration for it in Beethoven's mind". The musicologist Alexander Rehding points out that even Bernstein, who used "Freiheit" in two performances in 1989, called it conjecture whether Schiller used "joy" as code for "freedom" and that scholarly consensus holds that there is no factual basis for this myth.

== Use of Beethoven's setting ==
Anthem of the European Union
Instrumental performed by the United States Navy Band

Melody in G major

Over the years, Beethoven's "Ode to Joy" has been used both as a protest song/melody, national anthem and a piece of remembrance.

- Known as the Anthem of Europe, it has been the anthem of the Council of Europe since 1972, and the anthem of the European Union since 1985.
- In 1957, the blacklisted American opera singer Paul Robeson sang “Ode to Joy” at a festival for 5,000 miners in Wales, but as his passport had been revoked, he couldn't leave the USA, so he sang it via a transatlantic telephone line.
- The melody was used for the national anthem of Ian Smith's Rhodesia between 1974 and 1979, called Rise, O Voices of Rhodesia.
- During the Military dictatorship of Chile (1973–1990), female protesters gathered outside prisons to sing “Himno a la Alegría,” a Spanish version of “Ode to Joy,” to bring hope to those being held inside.
- Chinese students broadcast it at 1989 Tiananmen Square protests.
- It was performed in Berlin on Christmas Day 1989 after the fall of the Berlin Wall, with the choir and orchestra members from both East and West Germany, conducted by Leonard Bernstein.
- “Ode to Joy” is performed at Daiku (Number Nine) concerts in Japan every December after the 2011 tsunami.
- It has inspired impromptu performances at public spaces by musicians in many countries worldwide, including Choir Without Borders' 2009 performance at a railway station in Leipzig, to mark the 20th and 25th anniversary of the Fall of the Berlin Wall, Hong Kong Festival Orchestra's 2013 performance at a Hong Kong mall, and performance in Sabadell, Spain.
- A 2013 documentary, Following the Ninth, directed by Kerry Candaele, follows its continuing popularity.
- It was played after Emmanuel Macron's victory in the 2017 French Presidential elections, when Macron gave his victory speech at the Louvre.
- The BBC Proms Youth Choir performed the piece alongside Georg Solti's UNESCO World Orchestra for Peace at the Royal Albert Hall during the 2018 Proms at Prom 9, titled "War & Peace" as a commemoration to the centenary of the end of World War One.
- The alleged Christian context of the song was one of the main reasons given by Nichiren Shoshu priests for expelling the Soka Gakkai International on 28 November 1991 due to the song being performed at SGI meetings, which was deemed by some priests as both syncretism and heresy.
- The instrumental version is used as the official UEFA European Qualifiers anthem, and is also used as the official Copa Libertadores anthem.
- A Yiddish version of the lyrics was written by Isaac Leib Peretz in the 1890s, and it is still used as a Jewish protest song.
- The instrumental version of the song was played at 2008 UEFA Champions League final, after Manchester United players lifted the trophy.
- Neon Genesis Evangelion character Kaworu Nagisa is heard humming "Ode to Joy" when he is first introduced.

== Other musical settings ==
Other musical settings of the poem include:

- Christian Gottfried Körner (1786)
- Carl Friedrich Zelter (1792), for choir and accompaniment, later rewritten for different instrumentations.
- Johann Friedrich Reichardt (1796)
- Ludwig-Wilhelm Tepper de Ferguson (1796)
- Johann Friedrich Hugo von Dalberg (1799)
- Johann Rudolf Zumsteeg (1803)

External audio
- Schubert's "An die Freude" on YouTube, Dietrich Fischer-Dieskau, Gerald Moore

- Franz Schubert's song "An die Freude", D 189, for voice, unison choir and piano. Composed in May 1815, Schubert's setting was first published in 1829 as Op. post. 111 No. 1. The 19th century Gesamt-Ausgabe included it as a lied in Series XX, Volume 2 (No. 66). The New Schubert Edition groups it with the part songs in Series III (Volume 3).
- Pyotr Ilyich Tchaikovsky (1865), for solo singers, choir and orchestra in a Russian translation
- Pietro Mascagni cantata "Alla gioia" (1882), Italian text by Andrea Maffei
- "Seid umschlungen, Millionen!" (1892), waltz by Johann Strauss II
- Z. Randall Stroope (2002), for choir and four-hand piano
- Victoria Poleva (2009), for soprano, mixed choir and symphony orchestra
