= Thalia (German magazine) =

Periodical literature

Thalia was a German magazine on history, theatre, culture, philosophy, literature and politics. It was set up in 1784 by Friedrich Schiller while he was poet to the National Theatre Mannheim. The headquarters was in Leipzig. Schiller's poem "An die Freude" was first published in Thalia in 1786. It was named after the ancient Greek Muse or Grace of the same name. It closed in 1791.
