= Seid umschlungen, Millionen! =

Waltz composed by Johann Strauss II

Seid umschlungen, Millionen! (Be Embraced, You Millions!), opus 443, is a waltz composed by Johann Strauss II. It was first performed at the Great Hall of the Musikverein in Vienna in March 1892. The title of the waltz was borrowed from Friedrich Schiller's Ode an die Freude (Ode to Joy). The composition was dedicated to Strauss' close friend Johannes Brahms.
