= John Maciuika =

Lithuanian-American professor

John Vincent Maciuika
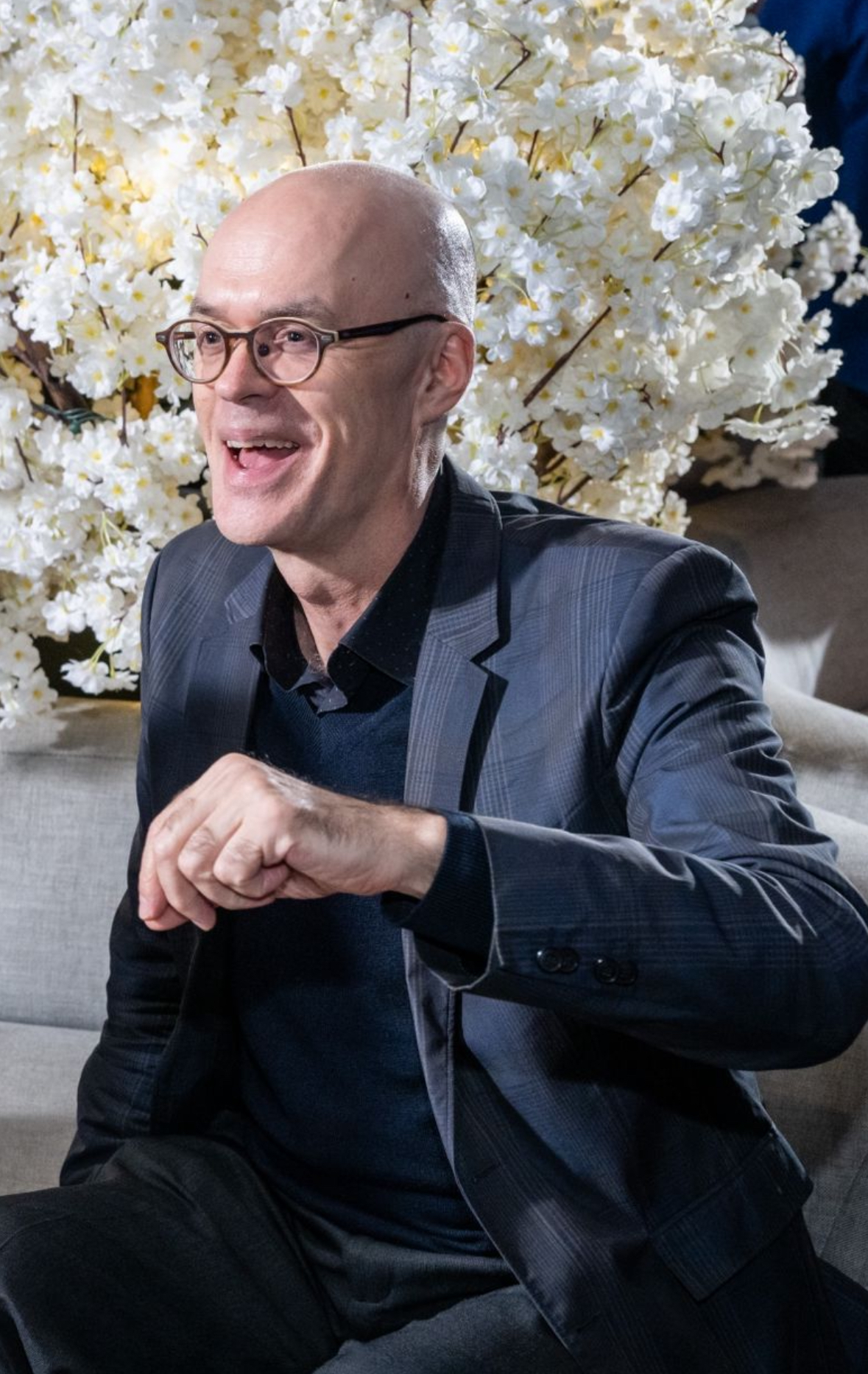
- Born: John Vincent Maciuika; Lithuanian: Jonas Vincas Mačiuika; 1965 10 26
- Citizenship: American
- Education: University of Pennsylvania; University of California Berkeley
- Occupations: professor, author, historian, researcher
- Awards: Rome Prize; DAAD Outstanding Research Prize

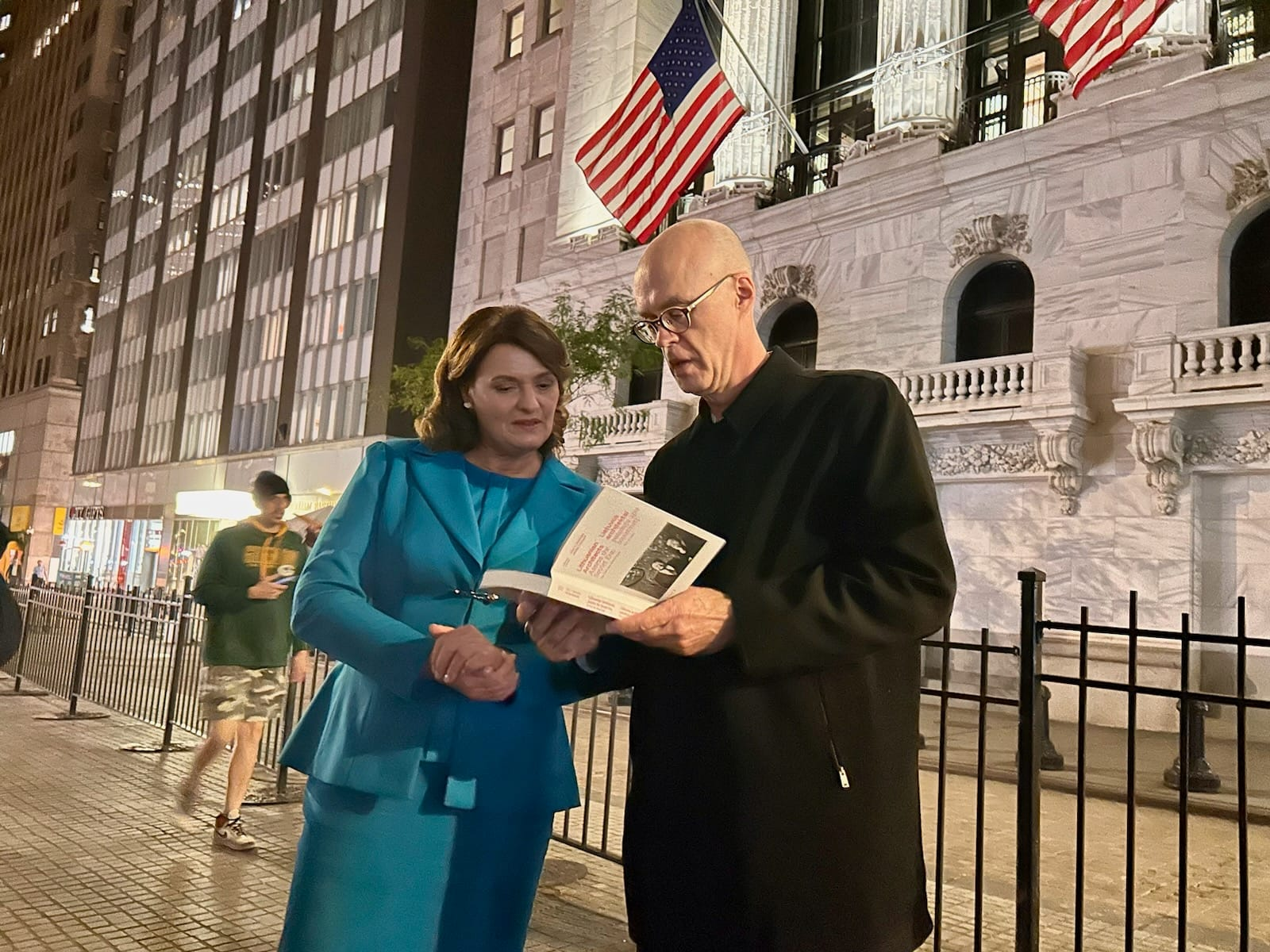
John Maciuika with Lithuania's first lady Diana Nausediene

John Vincent Maciuika (Lithuanian: Jonas Vincas Mačiuika), born 26 October 1965, is a professor of art and architectural history at Baruch College, City University of New York. He teaches undergraduate and graduate courses on the history of architecture, urbanism and applied arts. The focus of his research in two books, dozens of research articles, and numerous lectures and interviews is the relationship between architecture, cultural identity, and national identity in Central and Eastern Europe.

John is featured in various articles, radio and TV programmes on architectural history in Lithuanian and American media.

== Selected bibliography ==
- Lithuanian Architects Assess The Soviet Era: The 1992 Oral History Tapes. Bilingual edition, in collaboration with Marija Dremaite. LAPAS, 2020.
  ISBN 978-609-8198-27-0
- Before the Bauhaus: Architecture, Politics, and the German State, 1890–1920. Cambridge University Press, 2005; paperback edition 2008.
  ISBN 978-052-1728-22-5
- Before the Bauhaus: Architecture, Politics, and the German State, 1890–1920. Japanese edition, published in 2015 as ビフォー ザ バウハウス: ジョン マシュイカ カスタマーレビューを書きませんか. Sangen-Sha academic press, 2015.
  ISBN 978-488-3033-33-1

== See also ==
- Benediktas Vytenis Mačiuika, John's father
- Antanas Mačiuika, John's grandfather
