= Susan Cotts Watkins =

American demographer (1938–2024)

Susan Cotts Watkins (October 26, 1938 – August 26, 2024) was an American demographer. She was a professor at Yale University and the University of Pennsylvania, and later professor emerita at the University of Pennsylvania. Her research focused on the impact of social networks on cultural change in the demography of the U.S., Western Europe, and Africa.

== Biography ==
A native of the United States, Susan C. Watkins graduated with high honors from Swarthmore College in 1956. After child-raising, she returned to academia, receiving a PhD from Princeton University in 1980 for her dissertation on Variation and Persistence in Age Patterns of Marriage in Europe, 1870–1960, for which she received the Porter Ogden Jacobus Fellowship, the highest honor of the Graduate School at Princeton University, 1978–79. Following three years as an assistant professor at Yale, the University of Pennsylvania invited her to join its Department of Sociology and the Population Studies Center. There, she was an assistant professor (1982–1986), an associate professor (1986–1995), and a full professor until she became professor emerita in 2007. During that time, she mentored more than 100 graduate students. In 2009 she was awarded the prestigious John Simon Guggenheim Memorial Foundation Fellowship. She was a member of the Institute of Advanced Study at Princeton, 1984–1985 and was a fellow of the Center for Advanced Studies in the Behavioral Sciences, Palo Alto, CA, 1992–1993.

Watkins' research covered multiple fields, drawing particularly on the fields of demography, sociology, and anthropology. She was on the board of the Population Association of America in 2001–2003. In 2005, she received the Irene Taeuber Award of the Population Association of America, for "exceptionally sound and innovative research." In 1992 the Sociology of Population Section of the American Sociological Association awarded her the Otis Dudley Duncan Award for distinguished scholarship in social demography for her book From Provinces to Nations. She was a visiting scholar at the California Center for Population Research at the University of California-Los Angeles.

Watkins died on August 26, 2024, at the age of 85.

== Research ==
=== The Malawi Journals Project ===
In 1999 Watkins instituted The Malawi Journals Project as a complement to a longitudinal survey that she was conducting in rural Malawi. At that time, Malawians were suffering and dying from a major AIDS epidemic. After the first round of the survey, she found evidence of social desirability bias. For example, when survey interviewers asked men under age 35 how many sexual partners they had, the typical response was that they had only one sexual partner, their wife. In this context, having only one partner was unusual. In many of the conversations, the men explained that having only one sexual partner was like eating the same meal every day.

The first round of the survey had provided a great deal of data about the composition and structure of the social networks in which rural Malawians talked about AIDS. It had not however, learned much about the content of the social interactions—what people said to each other, rather than to interviewers, about AIDS or their strategies for avoiding infection and death—and even less about the wider everyday interactions that shaped responses to the epidemic. Thus, the researchers improvised by commissioning 10 high school graduates, both men and women, who had worked for the survey to be participant observers during their daily routines. They were to pay attention to what their peers said about the AIDS epidemic in their informal social networks, and to write the conversation word for word in a private space. If they overheard anything concerning AIDS, they were to make mental notes of what people said and did, and then write their recollections word-for-word that evening or soon thereafter. The notebooks were sent to the researchers. In 2007, Watkins invited a colleague, Adam Ashforth, an ethnographer, to collaborate on the Project.

More than 1,000 journals have been written since 1999, each usually covering several different conversations. Since there are frequently several people conversing, the reader can overhear, at second hand, several thousand people. Twenty-two journalists (9 females, 13 males) have contributed to the corpus of texts, with three (two males, one female) contributing very frequently, 13 frequently, and six only occasionally. The diarists wrote in English, a language learned in school, and used parentheses or carets (< >) to set off their explanatory comments or untranslatable expressions in the local language.

Initially, Malawians were convinced that all would die of AIDS, and were skeptical about the attempts of the government and international organizations to reduce new HIV infections. Over the subsequent years, this began to change as conversational partners advised each other to be careful to select their sexual partners with care. By 2017, men and women speaking about AIDS in their social networks acknowledged that times had changed, and the number of new HIV infections had steeply declined.

=== Kenya Diffusion and Ideational Change Project ===
In 1994, Watkins began research on the Kenya Diffusion and Ideational Change Project, a study on the role of social networks on changing attitudes and behavior regarding family size, family planning, and HIV/AIDS in Kenya. The study found that perceived risks, as well as preferred methods of protection against HIV-infection, depend in general on the prevailing perceptions and favored protective methods within personal communication networks. Risk-perceptions of women were found to be shaped by strong relationships and cohesive network structures, while males' risk perception depended more on the number of risk-perceivers in their communication networks. The research was conducted through the form of focus groups and semi-structured interviews.

=== The Malawi Longitudinal Study of Families and Health ===
In 1998, Watkins began research on The Malawi Longitudinal Study of Families and Health. The study's goal was to investigate the multiple influences that contribute to HIV risks in sexual partnerships; the variety of ways in which people manage risk within and outside of marriage and other sexual relationships; the possible effects of HIV prevention policies and programs; and the mechanisms through which poor rural individuals, families, households, and communities cope with the impacts of high AIDS-related morbidity and mortality. The study found a number of factors that contributed to the spread of HIV/AIDS in Malawi. Among those factors were the high rate of sexual encounters among youth, and a general unwillingness to follow HIV prevention methods.

=== Altruism in Africa ===
In 2017, Watkins published A Fraught Embrace with Ann Swidler. The book detailed the relationships among philanthropists, beneficiaries, and brokers in the fight against AIDS in Africa. Watkins found that virtually all work in the fight against AIDS relied on brokers, who act as intermediaries between Western altruists and local villagers. Watkins and Swidler found that conflicts among these three groups often confounded efforts to fight AIDS. They argued that altruists could accomplish more good by helping Africans achieve their own goals, rather than seeking to transform African lives.

== Selected publications ==
=== In academic journals ===
- Hearsay Ethnography: Conversational Journals as a Method for Studying Culture in Action." 2009. Poetics 37 (2):162–184 (with Ann Swidler.
- Making Meaning in the Time of AIDS: Longitudinal Narratives from the Malawi Journals Project. 2015. African Journal of AIDS Research 14 (4): 303–314 (with A.Kaler & N. Angotti).
- Narratives of Death in Rural Malawi in a Time of AIDS. 2015. Africa 85 (2): 245–268 (with A. Ashforth).
- Asking God About the Date You Will Die: HIV Testing as a Zone of Uncertainty in Rural Malawi. 2010. Demographic Research, [Online] 23 (32): 905–932 (with A.Kaler). PMC 3090147.
- Navigating the AIDS Epidemic in Rural Malawi. 2004. Population and Development Review 30(4): 673–705.
- Accuracy, Stability and Reciprocity in Informal Conversational Networks in Rural Kenya. 2000, Social Networks 22: 337–355 (with K. White).
- Practices of Deliberation in Rural Malawi 2015. Chapter 7 in Deliberation and Development: Rethinking the Role of Voice and Collective Action in Unequal Societies, eds. Patrick Heller & Vijayenda Rao. Washington, D.C.: World Bank Group (with A.Swidler).
- Popular Moralities and Institutional Rationalities in Malawi’s Struggle Against AIDS 2014. Population and Development Review 40 (3): 447–473 (with N. Angotti, M. Frye, A. Kaler, M. Poulin, & S.Yeatman). PMC 4751039.
- The Buzz Outside the Clinics: Conversation and Contraception in Nyanza Province, Kenya 1997. Studies in Family Planning 28(4): 290–307 (with N. Rutenberg).
- Cohort Profile: The Malawi Longitudinal Study of Families and Health.” 2015. International Journal of Epidemiology 44 (2): 394–404 (with HP Koher, JR Behrman, P.Anglewicz, IV Kohler, RL Thornton, J. Mkandawire, H.Honde, A. Hawara, B. Chilima, C. Bandawe, V. Mwapasa).
- Social Networks and HIV/AIDS Risk Perceptions 2007. Demography 44(1):1–33 (with H.P. Kohler & J.R. Behrman).
- Sex in Geneva, Sex in Lilongwe, Sex in Balaka. 2007. Social Science & Medicine 64(5):1090–1101 (with L.Tawfik).
- Social Interactions and HIV/AIDS in Rural Malawi (Ed). 2003. Demographic Research [Online] 9 (12): 285–296 (with E.Zulu, H-P Kohler & J.Behrman).
- The Social and the Sexual: Networks in Contemporary Demographic Research. 2015. In Population in the Human Sciences: Concepts, Models, Evidence, eds P. Kreager, C. Capalli, S., Ulijazek, S., Winney, B. Oxford, UK: Oxford University Press. (with HP Kohler, S. Helleringer & J. Behrman) See also: [https://web.archive.org/web/20151206053531/http://repository.upenn.edu/psc_working_papers/41/ upenn.edu].
- Developmental Idealism and Cultural Models of the Family in Malawi. 2014. Population Research and Policy Review 33 (5): 693–716 (with A. Thornton). PMC 4153731.
- Outsourcing Social Transformation: Development NGOs as Organizations. 2012. Annual Review of Sociology 38: 285–315) (with A. Swidler & T. Hannan).
- Working Misunderstandings: Donors, Brokers and Villagers in Africa’s AIDS Industry. 2012. Population and Development Review 38 (Supp):197–218 (with A.Swidler).
- Men with Money and the 'Vulnerable Women' Client Category in an AIDS Epidemic. 2016. World Development 85: 16–30. (with M. Poulin & K. Dovel)
- Mixed-Method Quasi-Experimental Study of Outcomes of a Large-Scale Multilevel Economic and Food Security Intervention on HIV Vulnerability in Rural Malawi 2017. AIDS and Behavior (with L.S. Weinhardt, L.W. Galvao, A.F Yan, P.E Stevens, T. E. Mwenyekonde, E. Ngui, L. Emer, K.M. Grande, L. Mkandawire-Valhmu).
- Methods and Protocol of a Mixed Method Quasi-Experiment to Evaluate the Effects of a Structural Economic and Food Security Intervention on HIV Vulnerability in Rural Malawi: The Sage4health Study. 2014. SpringerPlus 3:296 (with L.S. Weinhardt, L.W. Galvao, T. Mwenyekonde, K.M. Grande, P. Stevens, A.F. Yan, L. Mkandawire-Valhmu, W. Masanjala, J. Kibicho, E. Ngui, L. Emer). PMC 4082534.
- Keeping the Family in Family Planning. 2014. The Lancet Global Health 2 (7): e383 (with J. Trinitapoli, J. Verheijen & S. Yeatman). PMC 4391622.
- The Changing Role of Health-Oriented International Organizations and Nongovernmental Organizations. 2016. The International Journal of Health Planning and Management 31 (4): 488–510 (with K. Okma, A. Kay, S. Hockenberry,& J. Liu)
- Correspondence: “Men’s heightened risk of AIDS-related death: The legacy of gendered HIV testing & treatment strategies.” 2015. AIDS 29: 1123–1125 (with K.Dovel, S.Yeatman & M.Poulin). PMC 4454403. Response to Fleming & Dworkin: “Prioritizing Strategies to Reduce AIDS-Related Mortality for Men in Sub-Saharan Africa: Authors' Reply”: authors’ reply to Fleming & Dworkin. AIDS 2016, 30 (1): 158–159.
- Accurate Information as a Tool to Decrease HIV Test Refusals in Research Studies. 2015. Editorial, Bulletin of the World Health Organization 93 (5): 357–358 (with P. Anglewicz, N.Angotti, A.Kaler & A.Swidler). PMC 4431511.

=== Books published ===
A Fraught Embrace: The Romance and Reality of AIDS Altruism in Africa. 2017. Princeton University Press (with A. Swidler).

From Provinces Into Nations: The Demographic Integration of Western Europe, 1870-1960. 1991. Princeton, NJ. Princeton University Press.

The Decline of Fertility in Europe. Editor. 1986. Princeton, N.J.: Princeton University Press (with Ansley J. Coale).

== Awards and fellowships ==
John Simon Guggenheim Memorial Foundation fellowship 2009

Irene Taeuber Award for “exceptionally sound and innovative research”, Population Association of America, 2005

Steering Committee, Mellon Foundation Southern African HIV/AIDS Node, 2001–2005

Gifford Distinguished Scholar Lecture, University of California-Davis, 1999

Herbert Spencer Lecture, Oxford University, 1995

Sociological Research Association, Elected Member 1994.

First Annual Otis Dudley Duncan Award for distinguished scholarship in social demography, awarded by the Sociology of Population Section of the American Sociological Association, for From Provinces to Nations, 1992.

Center for Advanced Study in the Behavioral Sciences, Palo Alto, award for research leave 1992–93.

Hewlett Foundation Graduate Training Grant, 1992–1997, $750,000.

American Council of Learned Societies, award for research leave 1988–89.

Research Foundation awards, University of Pennsylvania, 1989, 1991.

Visiting Fellow, Australia Family Project, Australian National University, June–August 1988.

Member, Institute for Advanced Study, Princeton, N.J. 1984–85.

Visiting Fellow, Research School of the Social Sciences, Australian National University, August‑ September 1984.

Yale Junior Faculty Fellowship, awarded for academic leave, 1981‑82.

Porter Ogden Jacobus Fellowship, highest honor of the Graduate School of Princeton University, 1978‑79.
