= Ersela Kripa =

Albanian-American architect

Ersela Kripa is an Albanian-born, American architect, artist, and teacher. Her work has won numerous awards and honors, including the Rome Prize, the Architecture Award from the American Academy of Arts and Letters, and the MacDowell Fellowship. She currently directs the architecture program at Texas Tech University, El Paso.

== Life and education ==
Kripa was born in the People's Socialist Republic of Albania, and briefly lived in Greece as a refugee before seeking asylum in the United States in 1996. Her father was a structural engineer and Kripa credits her interest in architecture to learning from his work with architectural blueprints. During her time in Albania her family experienced persecution and lived through civil war. She studied architecture as an undergraduate student, at the New Jersey Institute of Technology, and later earned an M.S. in Advanced Architectural Design from Columbia University. Her husband, Stephen Mueller, is also an architect.

== Career ==
Kripa and her husband, Stephen Mueller, established an architectural firm called Agency, after receiving a fellowship from Columbia University, using it to travel to Albania and study buildings established by Edi Rama, a former Prime Minister of Albania. This research formed the basis of a book, Nation Building Aesthetics. Kripa and Mueller practiced in New York for several years, and Kripa won a MacDowell Colony fellowship in 2009 and 2013. During this period she also taught architecture at the New Jersey Institute of Technology. In 2010–2011, she and Mueller were recipients of the Rome Prize for architecture, and spent a year in Rome, studying the forced relocation of the Romani people, and developing proposals that would accommodate Roma and Roman architecture in resettlement and habitation. In 2010, Kripa won a fellowship from the New York Foundation for the Arts in the field of architecture. In 2015, Kripa moved with her firm to El Paso, Texas, and is currently associate professor and director of the architecture program at Texas Tech University, El Paso. In 2020, Kripa and Mueller published a book, FRONTS: Military Urbanisms and the Developing World (2020) ISBN 1941806953, which studied architecture, design, and ecology around military sites in urban spaces.

Kripa's architectural work and research focuses on marginalized communities in urban and border spaces, examining the intersection of rights, and design. Along with her firm, Kripa has developed projects that engage with issues of security, migration, and privacy, such as the development of low-cost air quality systems for lower-income communities along the U.S. Mexico-border, and a training space to teach de-escalation tactics to police and security forces. In 2018, they won the 'Emerging Voices' Award from The Architectural League of New York for their work in examining personal agency in conflict zones. Installations designed by Kripa have been exhibited at the Hong Kong–Shenzhen Bi-City Biennale for Architecture and Urbanism, the Venice Biennale, and the Berlin Biennale.
