= Paul Desenne =

Venezuelan composer (1959–2023)

Paul Xavier Desenne Hable (7 December 1959 – 20 May 2023) was a Venezuelan cellist and composer.

== Biography ==
Desenne was born on 7 December 1959, in Caracas, where he was also raised. In 1977, he was a founding member of the Simón Bolívar Youth Orchestra, for whom he later became the resident composer. He studied composition for 11 years in Paris.

Desenne's main instrument was the cello. He won first prize in cello performance at the Conservatoire National Supérieur de Paris. After returning from Paris, Desenne joined the Simón Bolívar Symphony Orchestra and was El Sistema's resident composer.

In 2002, Desenne took a sabbatical from teaching and performance to concentrate on composition. Desenne's works have been performed in major venues around the world, including Alice Tully Hall at the Lincoln Center for the Performing Arts and Joan and Sanford I. Weill Recital Hall at Carnegie Hall. On 4 September 2016, Desenne's work Hipnosis mariposa was premiered at The Proms by Simón Bolívar Symphony Orchestra conducted by Gustavo Dudamel.

In 2006, Desenne became a Fellow at Civitella Ranieri Center in Umbria, Italy, and was awarded a Guggenheim Fellowship in 2009. From 2010 to 2011 he was a Fellow at the Radcliffe Institute at Harvard University.

Desenne was resident composer with FESNOJIV (El Sistema) in Venezuela. He wrote a weekly column on music for the Venezuelan national newspaper El Nacional. In 2015-2016, he was Composer in Residence with the Alabama Symphony Orchestra.

On 20 May 2023, Desenne died from a heart attack in Boston, Massachusetts, at the age of 63. His widow Carmen Liliana Rojas Marulanda survives him.

== Works ==
Desenne wrote instrumental music for cello, flute, and combinations of instruments, and wrote an opera based on the story of coffee cultivation. His works include:

- Gurrufío for flute orchestra (1997)
- Solo Flute Sonata (2001)
- "Jaguar Songs" (2002), a sonata for solo cello
- "The Two Seasons of the Caribbean Tropics" (2003), a violin concerto
- Guasa Macabra for flute and clarinet (2003)
- Sinfonía Burocratica ed’Amazzonica (2004), a "tropical symphony in five movements"
- Palenkumbé (2007), an overture incorporating Latin rhythms and folk songs
- Gran Cacelorazo (2010), a piece for piano, percussion, and strings
- La Revoltosa, two chamber works for clarinet
- Hipnosis Mariposa (2014)
- "Life of Benjamin: a Monkey Symphony" (2015)
- Symphony No. 5 (2016)
- Guasamacabra for orchestra (2018)
