= Stephen Ellis =

Stephen Ellis may refer to:

- Stephen Ellis (politician) (born 1968), Canadian politician
- Stephen Ellis (film editor), British documentary film editor and producer
- Stephen Ellis (historian) (1953–2015), British historian, Africanist and human rights activist

== See also ==
- Steven Ellis (disambiguation)
