= Thomas Brothers =

American musicologist

Thomas D. Brothers is an American musicologist, and professor at Duke University.

He graduated from University of Pennsylvania, magna cum laude with B.A. in music, in 1979, from University of California, Berkeley with an M.A. in music, in 1982, and with a Ph.D. in music, in 1991.

== Awards ==
- Finalist for the 2015 Pulitzer Prize for Biography or Autobiography (Louis Armstrong: Master of Modernism)
- 2014 Irving Lowens Book Award from the Society for American Music for best book on American music (Louis Armstrong: Master of Modernism)
- 2009 Guggenheim Fellowship
- 2003–2004 National Humanities Center Fellow
- 2001–2002 John Hope Franklin Institute Fellow, Duke University
- 1999–2000 Harvard Fellow at Villa I Tatti, Research Center for Renaissance Studies in Florence Italy

== Works ==
- Chromatic Beauty in the Late Medieval Chanson: An Interpretation of Manuscript Accidentals Cambridge University Press, 1997, ISBN 978-0-521-55051-2
- Louis Armstrong In His Own Words, Oxford University Press, 2001, ISBN 978-0-19-514046-0
- Louis Armstrong's New Orleans, W. W. Norton & Company, 2007, ISBN 978-0-393-33001-4
- Artists, Writers, and Musicians: An Encyclopedia of People Who Changed the World, Editors Michel-André Bossy, Thomas Brothers, John C. McEnroe, Greenwood Publishing Group, 2001, ISBN 978-1-57356-154-9
- Louis Armstrong, Master of Modernism, W. W. Norton & Company, 2014, ISBN 978-0-393-06582-4
- Help!: The Beatles, Duke Ellington and the Magic of Collaboration, W. W. Norton and Company, 2018, ISBN 978-0-393-24623-0.
