= Rolando Peña =

Venezuelan-American artist and Warhol superstar

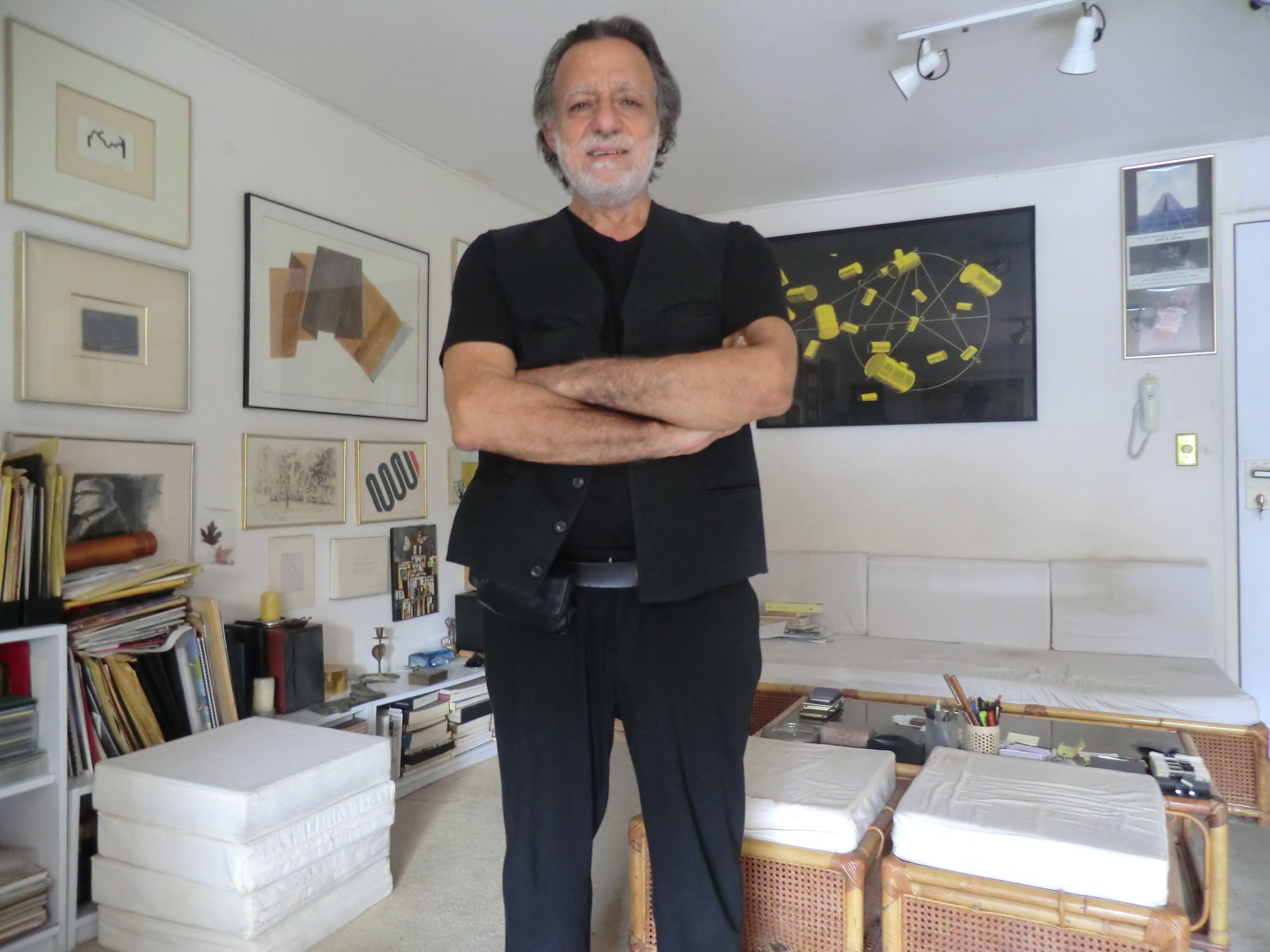
- Peña in 2013
- Born: October 27, 1942 (age 83); Caracas, Venezuela
- Known for: visual artist and dancer, one of the Warhol superstars, participated in a number of Warhol films
- Awards: a Guggenheim Fellowship during 2009

Rolando Peña (born October 27, 1942, in Caracas, Venezuela) is a Venezuelan-American visual artist and dancer. He is best known as one of the Warhol superstars, and he participated in a number of Warhol films.

Among Warhol superstars, Peña is known as "the Black Prince", or "El Principe Negro".

He was awarded a Guggenheim Fellowship during 2009.

== Exhibitions ==
Peña's early work on photomaton photography, was recently show at an exhibition in Miami, Florida.
