= Susan Middleton =

American photographer and author

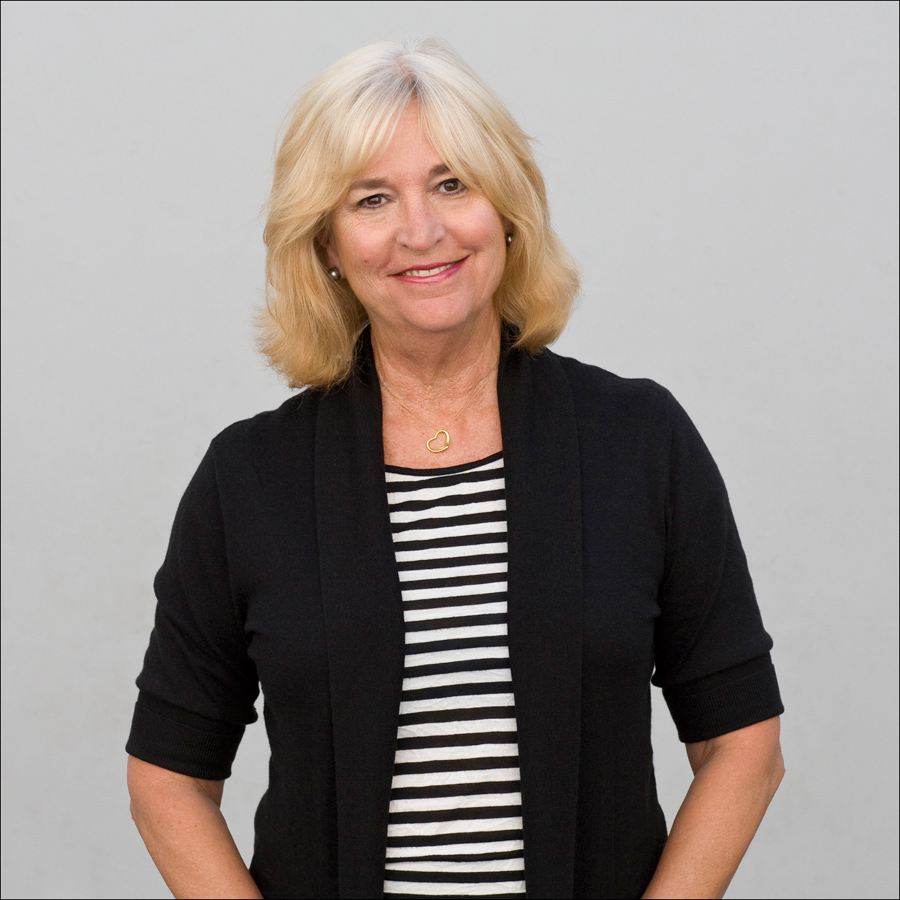
- Born: 1948 (age 77–78); Seattle, Washington
- Notable work: Spineless: Portraits of Marine Invertebrates, the Backbone of Life
- Website: susanmiddleton.com

Susan Middleton (born 1948) is an American photographer and author based in San Francisco. She is most known for her photographs of rare and endangered animals, plants, and sites. She was Chair of the Department of Photography at the California Academy of Sciences from 1982 to 1995, where she currently serves as Research Associate.

Middleton has authored several books. Her latest book, Spineless: Portraits of Marine Invertebrates, the Backbone of Life, was published in 2014 to critical acclaim.

== Early life and education ==
Middleton was born and raised in Seattle, Washington. She went to Shorecrest High School and later attended Santa Clara University from which she graduated with a Bachelor of Science in sociology with an emphasis in art.

== Career ==
After completing her bachelor's degree, Middleton moved to San Francisco where she served as Chair of the Department of Photography at the California Academy of Sciences from 1982 to 1995. In the early 1980s, the style of her plant and animal portraits changed when she photographed a federally endangered Fringed-Toed Sand Lizard on a piece of black velvet instead of in a composed natural environment. The technique led to an exhibition and her first book, Here Today: Portraits of Our Vanishing Species. She has used the same photographic technique for most of her photographs.

In 1985, Middleton worked with Richard Avedon in his New York studio where she coordinated print production for his exhibit, In The American West. Her field portraiture of plant and animal species has been likened stylistically to the work of Avedon. In New York, Middleton worked with photographer David Liittschwager with whom she subsequently collaborated on several projects.

In 1994, she travelled to West Africa as a consultant to the Getty Conservation Institute. In the region's tribal capital of Abomey, Benin, she documented the conservation project for the Royal Palace, during which time she also trained local partners culminating in a book and film produced by the Getty. Middleton later continued research in West Africa on the tradition of Vodoun.

In photographing the endangered flora and fauna of the Northwestern Hawaiian Islands, Middleton's work contributed in 2006 to a presidential declaration of the region as a Marine National Monument. She produced the thirty-minute documentary film Archipelago: Portraits of Life in the World’s Most Remote Island Sanctuary, which focused on the Northwestern Hawaiian Islands. In February 2007 she gave a presentation at the White House for First Lady Laura Bush, in preparation for her official visit to Midway Atoll, highlighting the designation of the NWHI as a Marine National Monument. She was also invited to accompany Mrs. Bush on her visit to Midway.

Her work is in the permanent collections of many museums and institutions including Center for Creative Photography, the National Oceanic and Atmospheric Administration, Papahanaumokuakea Marine National Monument, The Nature Conservancy, the National Academy of Sciences, Houston Museum of Fine Arts and the National Gallery of Art.

Middleton was an associate producer of America's Endangered Species: Don’t Say Goodbye, an Emmy-Award-winning documentary made for National Geographic. Middleton’s work has been exhibited in museums worldwide and has been widely published including: National Geographic, New York Times, Audubon, Smithsonian, Discover, Natural History, & Orion.

== Books ==
Middleton has co-authored, with David Liittschwager, four books: Archipelago: Portraits of Life in the World’s Most Remote Island Sanctuary; Remains of a Rainbow: Rare Plants and Animals of Hawai’i; Witness: Endangered Species of North America; which was named the Photographic Book of the Year by the Maine Photographic Workshop; and Here Today: Portraits of Our Vanishing Species. She curated travelling exhibitions in conjunction with each of these publications.

In 2009, she authored Evidence of Evolution in collaboration with Mary Ellen Hannibal. Her latest book is titled Spineless, which was published in 2014.

=== Evidence of Evolution ===
In 2009, Middleton partnered with author Mary Ellen Hannibal on Evidence of Evolution which commemorated the 150th anniversary of another publication: Darwin’s On the Origin of Species. In this work, she drew on the extensive collections of the California Academy of Sciences for her photographic subjects.

=== Spineless ===
In 2014, Middleton published Spineless: Portraits of Marine Invertebrates, the Backbone of Life, a book featuring 250 pictures, a foreword by Sylvia Earle, essays, and short descriptions of marine invertebrates. Middleton spent seven years from 2006 to 2013 photographing for this book. She worked on National Oceanic and Atmospheric Administration research vessels: one in the Northwestern Hawaiian Islands near French Frigate Shoals, and another in the Line Islands near Palmyra, Jarvis, and Kingman Reef in the central Pacific Ocean. She also photographed at Friday Harbor Marine Laboratory on San Juan Island, Washington. On the ships, Middleton set up temporary studios in the wet lab, which she shared with scientists conducting research, using modified aquariums to accommodate her subjects.

She worked with marine zoologists and scientific divers to collect the specimens, and sometimes she collected them herself. Many of the species in the book have only been photographed previously for scientific purposes; a few were recently discovered and have never been photographed before. In the Northwestern Hawaiian Islands, Middleton traveled with the first expedition to focus specifically on marine invertebrates there. Two previously unknown species appearing in the book for the first time are the Kanaloa Squat Lobster (Babamunida kanaloa) and the WanaWana Crab (Sakaila wanawana). The book received positive reviews.

== Critical reception ==
Middleton's photography has also received favorable reviews from many media outlets and critics. Praising Middleton's photographs of endangered species taken during the '80s and the '90s, Edward O. Wilson said "[these photos are] remarkable portraits [that] have a wholly different impact: they speak to the heart. In the end their kind of testimony may count as much toward conserving life as all the data and generalizations of science.”

Middleton's book, Spineless, received positive reviews from multiple media outlets. The New York Times wrote "her intense, often color-saturated photographs pulse with spellbinding strangeness: squids, jellies and nudibranchs; whelks, bloodworms and drupes; conches, urchins and chitons." and CNN wrote "Shot against plain black or white backgrounds, the weird beauty of these creatures—many of them rare species seldom seen by human eyes—really stands out." New York Review of Books wrote that "though not taken with a didactic purpose in mind, the images will doubtless be used by scientists for years to come" and The Wall Street Journal wrote "There is nothing in this book that does not inspire awe and delight. Dive in!" Peninsula Press wrote that "her photography of hermit crabs and other marine invertebrates lend them character, an unexpected twist in nature photography."

== Awards and honors ==
- Nature Conservancy's Distinguished Service Award – 1989
- Daisy Award for Achievement in the Arts from the Girl Scouts of the USA – 1992
- East West Center Fellow at the University of Hawaii – 1998
- Bay & Paul Foundation Biodiversity Leadership Award – 1999
- Endangered Species Coalition Champion Award for Education and Outreach – 2007
- Whitely Center Fellow at the University of Washington's Friday Harbor Marine Lab – 2007, 2009, 2010, 2011, 2013
- Guggenheim Fellowship – 2009

== Selected bibliography ==
- Spineless: Portraits of Marine Vertebrates, the Backbone of Life (2014) ISBN 978-1-4197-1007-0
- Evidence of Evolution (2009) ISBN 978-0-8109-4924-9
- Archipelago: Portrait of Life in the World’s Most Remote Sanctuary (2005) ISBN 0-7922-4188-6
- Remains of a Rainbow: Rare Plants and Animals of Hawaii (2001) ISBN 0-7922-6412-6
- Witness: Endangered Species of North America (1994) ISBN 0-8118-0282-5
- Here Today: Portraits of Our Vanishing Species (1991) ISBN 0-8118-0041-5
