= Richard M. Cook =

American academic

Richard M. Cook is an American academic who specializes in American literature. He was a recipient of a Guggenheim Fellowship in 2009 and is the author of a biography of the critic Alfred Kazin. Cook teaches American literature at the University of Missouri–St. Louis. He is also the recipient of fellowships from the Fulbright Foundation and the National Endowment for the Humanities.

== Early life and education ==
He obtained a B.A. from Franklin and Marshall College and a Ph.D. from the University of Michigan.

== Alfred Kazin ==
Cook's Alfred Kazin: A Biography is a 2008 life of the Jewish American literary critic. William Grimes felt that Cook's biography was excessively fair-minded, bending over backwards to give the frequently unpleasant Kazin the benefit of the doubt in most cases, despite criticising Kazin for his treatment of women. Grimes felt the book suffered from the fact that Kazin's life largely comprised minutiae of book reviewing, temporary employment, grant applications, and academic conferences. The Washington Post called it "excellent".

He also edited The Journals of Alfred Kazin published in 2011.

== Other work ==
He wrote Carson McCullers, a 1975 book-length study of the American novelist.
