= Matthew Connors =

American art photographer and educator

- Born: 1976 (age 49–50)
- Education: MFA, Photography, Yale University (2004); BA, English Literature, University of Chicago (1998)
- Occupations: Art photographer, educator
- Awards: International Center of Photography Infinity Award (Artist's Book) (2016); Abigail Cohen Rome Prize, American Academy in Rome (2024)
- Website: www.matthewconnors.com

Matthew Connors (born 1976) is an American photographer, artist and educator. He received the Abigail Cohen Rome Prize from the American Academy in Rome (2024), and the International Center of Photography Infinity Award for Artist's Book (2016). His work has been exhibited in a range of international institutions, including the Museum of Modern Art, New York; the Museum of Fine Arts, Boston; Museo di Arte Contemporanea, Rome; DOX Centre for Contemporary Art, Prague; and Storefront for Art and Architecture, New York.

Connors's photographs and publications have been reviewed and featured in numerous outlets including The New York Times, M, Le Magazine du Monde, The Wall Street Journal, British Journal of Photography, Frieze, The Brooklyn Rail, The California Sunday Magazine, Time, and The New Yorker.

== Early life and education ==
Connors was born in 1976. He grew up in Port Washington, New York. He earned a BA in English Literature from the University of Chicago in 1998 and an MFA in Photography from Yale University in 2004.

== Work ==
Connors works across photography, writing, and artist's books. His projects frequently engage contemporary history and politics, often in international contexts, during moments of acute social and geopolitical crises. Fire in Cairo (SPBH Editions, 2015) developed from trips to Egypt and presents a fragmentary visual account of the period surrounding the Egyptian Revolution and its aftermath. He has also photographed extensively in North Korea, in Ukraine at the outset of the war, and in Hong Kong during the Pro Democracy Movement. Connors's photographic work during the 2019 pro-democracy demonstrations in Hong Kong has been cited in connection with his being denied entry to Hong Kong in January 2020 and again in August 2023, according to press-freedom organizations and news reports.

== Awards and honors ==
- Abigail Cohen Rome Prize, American Academy in Rome (2024)
- MacDowell Fellowships (2010; 2019)
- Artist-in-Residence, Headlands Center for the Arts (2022)
- Light Work Artist-in-Residence (2017)
- International Center of Photography Infinity Award: Artist's Book (2016)

== Publications ==
- The Axe Will Survive the Master (MACK/SPBH, 2026)
- Fire in Cairo (SPBH Editions, 2015)
- Wake (Roman Nvmerals, 2019)
- The Poetics (with Lucy Ives) (ITI Press, 2019)

== Public collections ==
Connors' work is held in several museum collections including the Museum of Modern Art (New York), the Museum of Fine Arts (Boston), and The Yale University Art Gallery (New Haven).

== Teaching ==
Connors is a tenured professor in the Photography Department at Massachusetts College of Art and Design (MassArt) where he has taught since 2004 and periodically serves as department chair and Photography Graduate Program Director.

He has also taught in the Image Text Ithaca MFA Program and the Yale School of Art MFA Program.

Connors has led workshops, including for Fondazione di Sardegna / The Photo Solstice (Sardinia). He has also taught workshops at the Aperture Foundation, and the Humid.
