= Sam Kauffmann =

- Occupations: Filmmaker, author and academic

Academic background
- Education: BA., History; MS., Film
- Alma mater: Boston University; University of Pennsylvania

Academic work
- Institutions: Boston University
- Website: https://www.samkauffmann.com/

Sam Kauffmann is an American filmmaker, author and academic. He is a professor emeritus at Boston University. He was awarded a Guggenheim Fellowship in Creative Arts (Film), and his films have been shown at the Museum of Modern Art in New York, The White House, international film festivals, and broadcast on PBS and network television.

Kauffmann has received two Fulbright Awards, one to teach at Makerere University in Kampala, Uganda, and another at the National University of Rwanda. His works include Massacre at Murambi, Busing: A Rough Ride in Southie, Killing Time, Show Your Love, Living with Slim: Kids Talk About HIV/AIDS, Evangelicals for Climate Action, ACT Out Against SAT, and Talking Trees. Additionally, he is the author of Avid Editing: A Guide for Beginning and Intermediate Users, which is in its sixth edition, with translations published in Spanish, Russian, and Mandarin.

== Education and career ==
Kauffmann earned a BA in history from the University of Pennsylvania and an MS in film from Boston University. He began his career as a freelance cinematographer from 1977 to 1980. From 1981 to 1982, he worked as an independent filmmaker, producing films and segments that aired on PBS, ABC, and WGBH-TV. Between 1982 and 1985, he founded and directed Media Matrix, a media production company. Later, in 1986, he shifted focus to freelance writing, producing Arts On the Line, a film about public art in transportation, and The Mist That Thunders. He joined Boston University in 1987 as an assistant professor in the Department of Film and Television and took on administrative roles as chairman from 1992 to 1997 and Film Program Director from 1998 to 2002. In 2000, he was appointed associate professor before assuming the role of professor in 2009, and has been serving as professor emeritus of Film and Television in the College of Communication since 2020.

== Works ==
Kauffmann's works have comprised a wide range of media and publications focusing on social issues including HIV/AIDS awareness, father-child relationships, genocide and human rights, and environmental concerns, as well as film education.

=== Films ===
Kauffmann's early productions were collaborative projects with Ellen Boyce, including Portrait Without a Frame (1975), a documentary on visual artist Anthony Thompson, Busing: A Rough Ride in Southie (1976), which examined Boston's school desegregation, and Killing Time (1979), a study of the Massachusetts prison system.

He addressed social and environmental themes in films like Voices of a Divided City (1981), documenting racial tensions in Boston, Water: Not Enough to Waste (1983), focusing on conservation, and Beginning Changes (1984), an Oxfam project. His 1985 production Fire: Countdown to Disaster for the National Fire Protection Association earned multiple awards, including a Blue Ribbon at the National Educational Film Festival. In the 1990s, he explored topics such as family dynamics in Surviving the Family (1993), the absence of fathers in Show Your Love (1994), and the influence of media on children in Gone Too Far? Kids Talk About TV (1995). His 1997 film Lessons From the Ones We Love examined the roles of parents and teachers in children's education and was commissioned by Vice President Al Gore.

In the 2000s, Kauffmann continued working on social issues, with The Media and American Democracy (2000), analyzing the role of media in shaping public policy and democracy. His 2004 film Living with Slim: Kids Talk About HIV/AIDS followed seven Ugandan children living with HIV, highlighting their personal experiences and societal challenges, and received awards, including a special commendation from the Boston Society of Film Critics. Five years later, he revisited the children in Kids Living with Slim (2010), with an introduction from Alicia Keys, assessing how their lives had changed, earning a CINE Golden Eagle Award and a nomination for the Sembene Ousmane Award at the Al Jazeera International Documentary Film Festival. In 2007, he directed Massacre at Murambi, which focused on the 1994 Rwandan genocide. It aired on the PBS documentary series POV and was awarded the Grand Prix Award at the Crested Butte Reel Fest. In 2011, his film ACT Out Against SAT critiqued the biases inherent in standardized testing, and was featured in The Chronicle of Higher Education and The Huffington Post. Furthermore, his 2012 short Where's the Bloody Money? explored the comedic fallout of a bank heist gone wrong, winning an Award of Merit at the 2012 Indie Fest and Best Cinematography at the 15 Minutes of Fame Film Festival.

Kauffmann released Rachel Descending in 2012, which delved into the emotional impact of fertility struggles on a marriage and earned the Best Narrative Short at the Columbia Gorge International Film Festival and an Award of Merit at the Accolade Short Film Competition. His 2016 work, Evangelicals for Climate Action introduced Evangelicals working for environmental change, receiving Best Documentary at the Christian Film Festival. His environmental advocacy continued with We Trees (2021), a 2-minute film that imagined trees' perspective on human-caused climate disaster, and was followed by Talking Trees. In 2022, he created The Hungry Heron, a children's film aimed at fostering environmental awareness and was selected for film festivals, including the Children Short Film Festival and the Colorado Environmental Film Festival, and aired on PBS12 in Colorado.

=== Publications ===
Kauffmann first published Avid Editing: A Guide for Beginning and Intermediate Users in 2000. He has also written articles for media outlets such as the American Cinematographer, and the Christian Science Monitor.

== Awards and honors ==
- 2005 – Best Documentary Award, Cine Golden Eagle Film Festival
- 2005 – Special Commendation, Boston Society of Film Critics
- 2007 – Global Justice Award, Media That Matters Film Festival
- 2008 – Grand Prix Award, Crested Butte Reel Fest
- 2009 – Guggenheim Fellowship, John Simon Guggenheim Memorial Foundation
- 2012 – Best Cinematography, 15 Minutes of Fame Film Festival
- 2013 – Best Narrative Short, Columbia Gorge International Film Festival
- 2013 – Award of Merit, Accolade Global Film Competition
- 2023 – Best Dramatization, Cinema Verde Film Festival
- 2023 – Best Short Form Short Film, New York Feedback Film Festival

== Bibliography ==
- Avid Editing: A Guide for Beginning and Intermediate Users (6th edition, 2017) ISBN 978-1-138-93053-7

== Selected filmography ==
- Busing: A Rough Ride in Southie (1976)
- Show Your Love (1994)
- South Africa: Building Democracy (1998)
- Living with Slim: Kids Talk About HIV/AIDS (2004)
- Massacre at Murambi (2006)
- ACT Out Against SAT (2011)
- Rachel Descending (2013)
- Evangelicals for Climate Action (2016)
- We Trees (2021)
- The Hungry Heron (2022)
