= Ensemble Signal =

Classical music ensemble

Ensemble Signal is a contemporary classical music ensemble founded in 2008 and based in New York City. It is led by Brad Lubman and performs a variety of chamber, electro-acoustic, and large scale ensemble works.

== Work ==
Ensemble Signal specializes in the work of minimalist and post-minimalist composers like David Lang, Michael Gordon, Julia Wolfe, Steve Reich, and Philip Glass. Ensemble Signal's recording of Shelter was finalist for a Grammy. Since its debut in 2008, the ensemble has performed over 300 concerts, has premiered 20 works, and produced ten recordings.
