= Steven J. R. Ellis =

Australian archaeologist (born 1974)

- Born: Steven Ellis; April 21, 1974 (age 51); Sydney, Australia
- Occupation(s): Classicist and archaeologist

Academic background
- Doctoral advisor: Penelope Allison

Steven J. R. Ellis (born April 21, 1974) is an Australian classicist and archaeologist, and a professor of classics at the University of Cincinnati. His research focuses on Roman cities and archaeological methodologies, and he is widely known for his archaeological excavations at Pompeii. Ellis won the Rome Prize in 2012–2013. In 2018, Ellis wrote the book called The Roman Retail Revolution, published with Oxford University Press.

== Career ==
Ellis taught in the Department of Classical Studies at the University of Michigan between 2005 and 2007. He joined the Department of Classics at the University of Cincinnati in 2007 as an assistant professor of classics, gaining tenure and promotion to associate professor in 2013.

Ellis is the director of the Pompeii Archaeological Research Project: Porta Stabia, an archaeological excavation of Pompeii undertaken by the University of Cincinnati and the American Academy in Rome. His excavations at Pompeii gained popular attention when Apple featured the project's use of the iPad to record, access, and analyze data. Ellis won the Rome Prize of the American Academy in Rome (2012–2013).

== Books ==
- The Roman Retail Revolution. Oxford University Press, 2018.
- The Making of Pompeii: Studies in the history and urban development of an ancient town (Editor: JRA Supp. Series 85) Portsmouth, R.I. 2011.
