= Thomas J. Campanella =

American urban historian

Thomas Campanella is an American historian. He is a professor of City Planning at Cornell University.

Campanella received a BS from the State University of New York College of Environmental Science and Forestry in 1986, an MLA from Cornell University in 1991, and a PhD from the Massachusetts Institute of Technology in 1999.

Campanella was a 2009 Guggenheim fellow. His book Republic of Shade won the 2005 Spiro Kostof Award from the Society of Architectural Historians.

== Books ==
- Cities from the Sky: An Aerial Portrait of America (Princeton Architectural Press, 2001)
- Republic of Shade: New England and the American Elm (Yale University Press, 2003)
- The Concrete Dragon: China's Urban Revolution and What It Means for the World (Princeton Architectural Press, 2008)
- Brooklyn: The Once and Future City (Princeton University Press, 2019)
- Designing the American Century: The Public Landscapes of Clarke and Rapuano, 1915–1965 (Princeton University Press, 2025)
