= Alexander Rehding =

Fanny Peabody Professor of Music at Harvard University

Alexander Rehding is Fanny Peabody Professor of Music at Harvard University. Rehding is a music theorist and musicologist with a focus on intellectual history and media theory, known for innovative interdisciplinary work. His publications explore music in a wide range of contexts from Ancient Greek music to the Eurovision Song Contest—and even in outer space. His research has contributed to Riemannian theory, the history of music theory, sound studies, and media archaeology, reaching into the digital humanities and ecomusicology.

== Biography ==
A native of Hamburg, Germany, Rehding was educated at Queens' College, Cambridge University. He held research fellowships at Emmanuel College, Cambridge, the Penn Humanities Forum (now Wolf Humanities Center at the University of Pennsylvania) and the Society of Fellows in the Liberal Arts at Princeton University before joining the music department at Harvard University in 2003, initially as assistant professor. He was promoted to a full professorship only two years later, the first successful tenure case in the music department in over forty years. In 2009 he was named Fanny Peabody Professor of Music. Rehding served as department chair between 2011 and 2014. At Harvard, Rehding is an Affiliate of the Department of Germanic Languages and Literature, the Department of Visual and Environmental Studies and an Associate of the Minda de Gunzburg Center for European Studies and the Center for the Environment.

From 2006 to 2011 Rehding served as co-editor of Acta Musicologica (the journal of the International Musicological Society), and became Editor-in-chief of the Oxford Handbook Online series in Music in 2011. His has received awards and fellowships from the John Simon Guggenheim Memorial Foundation, American Council of Learned Societies (ACLS)., the Andrew W. Mellon Foundation, and the Alexander von Humboldt Foundation. He was a visiting scholar at the Free University of Berlin and the Max Planck Institute for the History of Science in Berlin, at the Newhouse Center at Wellesley College, Rieman and Baketel Fellow at the Radcliffe Institute of Advanced Study., and Anna-Maria Kellen Fellow at the American Academy in Berlin. He was the inaugural recipient of the Jerome Roche award of the Royal Musical Association, and received the Dent Medal awarded jointly by the Royal Musical Association and the International Musicological Society in 2014.

Rehding has been active in promoting the field of Sound studies. In 2013 Rehding founded the Sound Lab at Harvard. In 2013/14 he organized the Sawyer Seminars in the Comparative Study of Culture on the topic of "Hearing Modernity." The website now functions as an archive of the series. Using the resources of sound lab, Rehding launched a number of innovative courses, including The Art of Listening (as part of Harvard's short-lived "Frameworks in the Humanities" series). With the help of the Sound Lab, Rehding pursues the integration of multi-media projects into scholarship in the context of ongoing efforts to further open up the humanities to the digital domain.

In 2015-17 Rehding co-chaired a committee (with then department chair Carol Oja) that designed a new curriculum for Harvard's music concentration. The curricular reform was notable in that it was unanimously approved by the department but stirred much controversy in the wider field.

== Scholarship ==
=== History of music theory ===
Rehding has worked extensively on the influential nineteenth-century German music theorist Hugo Riemann, contributing to the historical figure as well as Neo-Riemannian theory. Rehding reconstructs the cultural and philosophical contexts in nineteenth-century Germany that allowed Riemann's problematic ideas to appear compelling and cogent, and explores particularly Riemann's encounters with non-Western music and the early period of sound reproduction.

The question of encounters of Western music theory with other musical traditions and repertories has guided much of Rehding's work in the history of music theory—covering a range of topics including ancient Greek music and the Enlightenment interest in Chinese music. His work on ancient Egyptian music takes as a starting point the paradox that no usable traces of this musical tradition survive, but it formed an essential early chapter in the general sweep of music history. The multiple attempts to reconstruct this repertory (without any facts) reveal much about changing historiographic assumptions.

Rehding's book Alien Listening: The Voyager Golden Record and Music from Earth (with Daniel Chua) takes this interest in the musical "other" to the largest level: in 1977 NASA sent a collection of world music into outer space, the Voyager Golden Record, in hopes that someone out there might find it some time in the distant future. Their project explores in an extended thought experiment NASA's assumption that music can be used to communicate with extraterrestrials and imagines what a posthuman music theory might look like.

=== Media aesthetics ===
A second major line of Rehding's research, extending from Hugo Riemann's diatribes against the modern technology of phonography in the late nineteenth century, explores the impact of technological media on musical thought.

The wider ramifications of questions of transmission and reconstruction led Rehding to an engagement with musical media, including notation and recording technology. In particular Rehding brings German media theory (Friedrich Kittler, Sybille Krämer, Wolfgang Ernst) to bear on music theory. The mechanical siren—an unlikely musical instrument—has played an important part in shaping Rehding's thinking about sound media, as has the little-known music theorist Friedrich Wilhelm Opelt.

Much of Rehding's work foregrounds the role of musical instruments in theorizing. He proposes that we regard them as media—promoting and inhibiting certain kinds of sounding data—that allow theorists to make certain insights. This intersection with Critical Organology, History of Science, and Thing theory is explored in a number of works.

His monograph on Beethoven's Ninth Symphony doubles as an exploration of media theory. It proposes an anti-chronological approach that re-hears this central work of the musical canon through its digital reimagination in Leif Inge's 9 Beet Stretch (2002).

Rehding has collaborated on the topic of neuroaesthetics with his husband Bevil Conway, a neuroscientist and visual artist.

=== Nineteenth- and twentieth-century music history ===
Rehding has published numerous articles on nineteenth- and twentieth-century music, on such composers as Ludwig van Beethoven, Richard Wagner, Franz Liszt, Igor Stravinsky and Arnold Schoenberg. His monograph Music and Monumentality was the first book-length exploration of this concept, exploring the imaginary connection between "big" sounds and ambitions of greatness in the music of nineteenth-century Germany. In a six vignettes, it approaches the "monumental" works of the German symphonic tradition between Beethoven and Bruckner, lodged between the aesthetics of the sublime and a nationally framed memory culture. The book has also been influential on the new field of arrangement studies.

He is series editor (with David R. M. Irving) of the multi-volume Cultural History of Western Music for Bloomsbury (2022).

=== Ecomusicology ===
Rehding may have inadvertently coined the term "Ecomusicology" when he used this title for a review article published in 2002. Explorations of the concept of nature have been an important part of his work in the history of music theory. His more recent contributions to this field have focused increasingly on contemporary ecological concerns (apocalyptic thinking, Anthropocene, the "Long Now"). Rehding argues that music, with its flexible temporalities, has an important role to play in fostering thinking about the distant future, corresponding to one major strand of contemporary ecological thought. His contributions on long timespans and extreme slowness fall under the wider field of chronocriticism.

=== Instruments of Music Theory ===
His interest in sound media and the history of theory come together in his work on "instruments of music theory." Building on Critical Organology, this concept picks up on the double meaning of "instrument" in scientific and musical frameworks and examines how musical instruments (e.g. monochord, piano, shi'er lü) are employed within music theory, to produce sounds that simultaneously generate knowledge about music.

== Select publications ==
=== Monographs ===
- Hugo Riemann and the Birth of Modern Musical Thought (2003)
- Music and Monumentality: Commemoration and Wonderment in Nineteenth-Century Germany (2009)
- Beethoven's Symphony no. 9 (2017)
- Alien Listening: The Voyager Golden Record and Music from Earth, with Daniel Chua (2021)

=== Edited volumes ===
- Music Theory and Natural Order from the Renaissance to the Early Twentieth Century, with Suzannah Clark (2001)
- The Oxford Handbook of Riemannian and Neo-Riemannian Music Theories, with Edward Gollin (2011)
- Music in Time: Phenomenology, Perception, Performance, with Suzannah Clark (2016)
- The Oxford Handbook of Critical Concepts in Music Theory, with Steven Rings (online; print: 2019)
- The Oxford Handbook of Timbre, with Emily Dolan (online; print: 2020)
- A Cultural History of Western Music in six volumes, with David R. M. Irving (2022)
