= Rome Prize =

American award for emerging artists and scholars

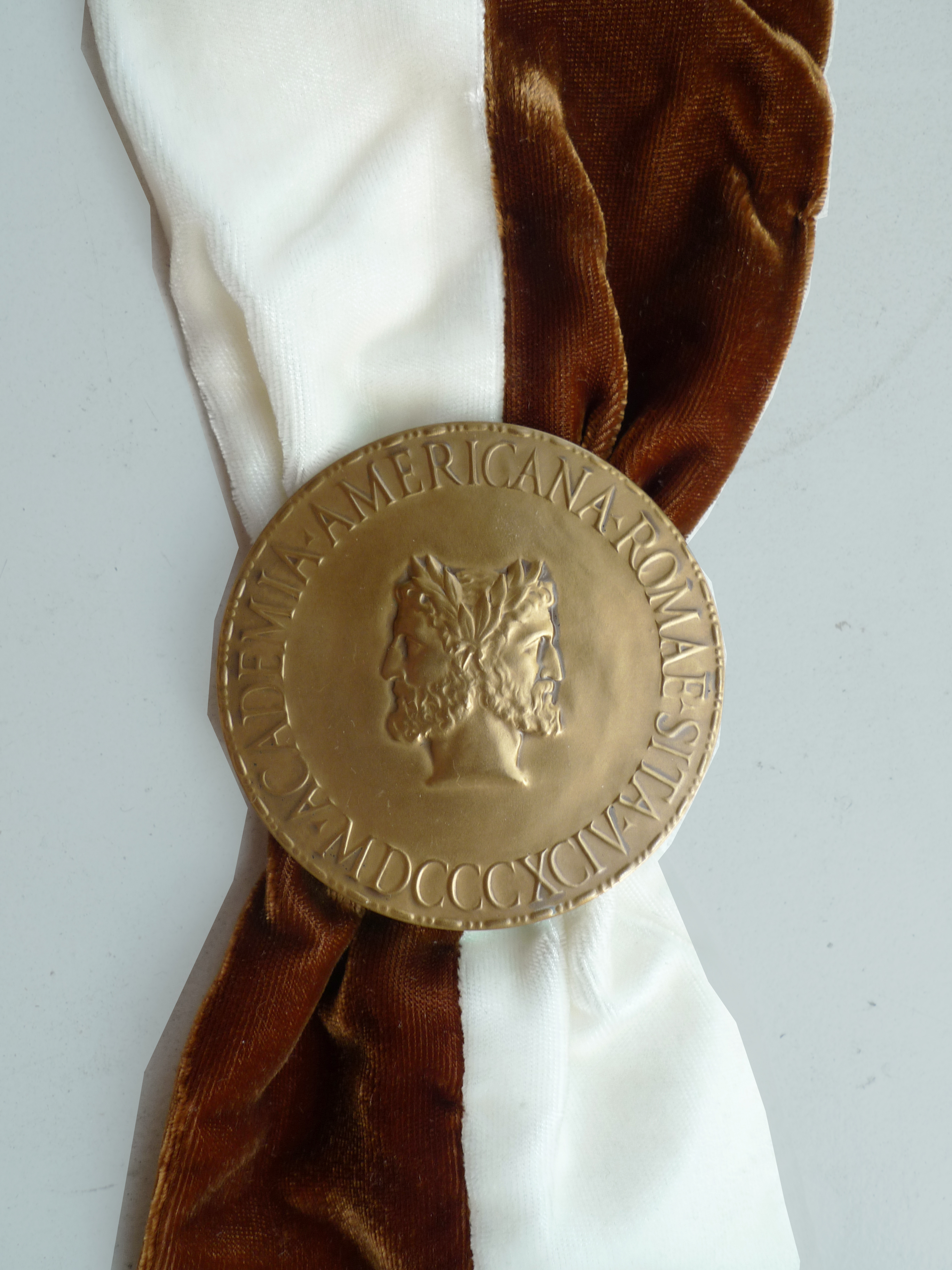
Baldric of the American Academy in Rome

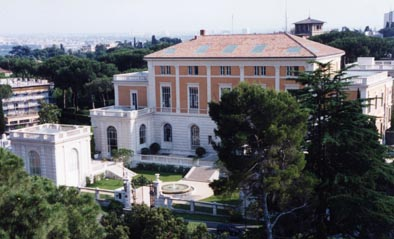
American Academy in Rome where prizewinners stay

The Rome Prize is awarded by the American Academy in Rome, in Rome, Italy. Approximately thirty scholars and artists are selected each year to receive a study fellowship at the academy. Recipients must be American citizens. Prizes have been awarded annually since 1921, with a hiatus during the World War II years, from 1942 to 1949.

== Recipients ==
Fellows and residents, listed by year of residency:

1896–1970	1971–1990	1991–2010	2011–present

== See also ==
- List of European art awards
- List of history awards
