= List of fellows of the American Academy in Rome (1991–2010) =

List of fellows and Residents of the American Academy in Rome is a list of those who have been awarded the Rome Prize or were residents of the American Academy in Rome.

The Rome Prize is a prestigious American award made annually by the American Academy in Rome, through a nationwide competition, to 15 emerging artists (working in architecture, landscape architecture, design, historic preservation and conservation, literature, musical composition, or visual arts) and to 15 scholars (working in ancient, medieval, renaissance and early modern, or modern Italian studies). Residents are selected from scholars and creative artists at a further stages in their career for shorter residencies at the American Academy. Some of these residents are marked (R) in the table below. Affiliated fellows (AFAAR) and visiting artists and scholars are not listed below.

List of fellows and residents of the American Academy in Rome
1896–1970	1971–1990	1991–2010	2011–present

== Fellows and residents of the American Academy in Rome ==
Year	Category	Winner	Type
1991	Classical studies & archaeology	Rebecca Miller Ammerman
1991	Post-classical humanistic studies	P. Renee Baernstein
1991	History of art	Janis C. Bell
1991	Visual arts	Suzanne Bocanegra
1991	Design	Steven Brooke
1991	Literature	John D. Casey	(R)
1991	Classical studies & archaeology	Diane A. Conlin
1991	Classical studies & archaeology	Catherine Cooper
1991	Design	Robert S. Davis
1991	History of art	Diane M. De Grazia	(R)
1991	Visual arts	Geraldine Erman
1991	Classical studies & archaeology	Harry B. Evans	(R)
1991	Musical composition	Lee Hyla
1991	Visual arts	Michael Kessler
1991	Musical composition	David Lang
1991	Classical studies & archaeology	Gregory Leftwich
1991	Post-classical humanistic studies	Daniel R. Lesnick
1991	Visual arts	Bert L. Long
1991	Visual arts	Elizabeth Murray	(R)
1991	Classical studies & archaeology	John G. Pedley
1991	Post-classical humanistic studies	John Francis Petruccione
1991	Architecture	Jason H. Ramos
1991	Visual arts	Dorothea Rockburne	(R)
1991	Visual arts	Glen Sacks
1991	Landscape architecture	Peter Lindsay Schaudt
1991	Architecture	Thomas L. Schumacher	(R)
1991	Design	Joel Sternfeld
1991	Classical studies & archaeology	Richard J. A. Talbert	(R)
1991	History of art	William R. Valerio
1991	History of art	Robert J. Williams
1991	Musical composition	Charles Wuorinen	(R)
1991	Musical composition	Yehudi Wyner	(R)
1991	Architecture	Christian Zapatka
1992	Design	William Adair
1992	Visual arts	Mel Bochner	(R)
1992	Post-classical humanistic studies	Margaret A. Brucia
1992	Literature	Mary Caponegro
1992	History of art	Jill Elizabeth Caskey
1992	Architecture	Henry N. Cobb	(R)
1992	Post-classical humanistic studies	Thomas V. Cohen
1992	Architecture	Teddy Edwin Cruz
1992	History of art	Anthony Cutler	(R)
1992	Musical composition	Donald J. Erb	(R)
1992	Classical studies & archaeology	J. Clayton Fant
1992	Landscape architecture	Eric Reid Fulford
1992	Design	Hsin-ming Fung
1992	Visual arts	Matthew B. Geller
1992	Musical composition	Stephen Hartke
1992	Classical studies & archaeology	Ross Holloway	(R)
1992	Post-classical humanistic studies	Diane Owen Hughes	(R)
1992	Musical composition	Bun-Ching Lam
1992	Post-classical humanistic studies	Anne Elizabeth MacNeil
1992	Visual arts	Rita McBride
1992	Architecture	Cameron McNall
1992	History of art	Sarah Collyer McPhee
1992	Classical studies & archaeology	Annapaola Mosca
1992	Landscape architecture	Thomas R. Oslund
1992	History of art	Linda Pellecchia
1992	Visual arts	Rebecca Quaytman
1992	Classical studies & archaeology	Charles Brian Rose
1992	Landscape architecture	Martha Schwartz	(R)
1992	Visual arts	Stuart Sherman
1992	Classical studies & archaeology	Susan L. TePaske-King
1992	History of art	Mary Vaccaro
1992	Landscape architecture	Peter Walker	(R)
1992	History of art	Bonna Daix Wescoat
1992	History of art	David H. Wright	(R)
1992	Design	Janet Zweig
1993	Design	Phillip R. Baldwin
1993	History of art	Carol A. Rusche
1994	History of art	Carmen Bambach
1994	Design	Karen Bausman
1994	Literature	Thomas Bolt
1994	Classical studies & archaeology	Gregory S. Bucher
1994	Post-classical humanistic studies	Christopher Celenza
1994	Classical studies & archaeology	Edward Champlin	(R)
1994	History of art	Brian A. Curran
1994	Musical composition	Sebastian Currier
1994	Historic preservation & conservation	Margaret Holben Ellis
1994	Classical studies & archaeology	Elaine Fantham	(R)
1994	Architecture	Garrett S. Finney
1994	Visual arts	Andrew Ginzel
1994	Classical studies & archaeology	Guy M. Hedreen
1994	Classical studies & archaeology	Elfriede Knauer	(R)
1994	Post-classical humanistic studies	Katherine Ludwig Jansen
1994	Classical studies & archaeology	Leah Johnson
1994	Visual arts	Kristin Jones
1994	Architecture	Karl Kirchwey
1994	Classical studies & archaeology	Richard Lim
1994	History of art	Jennifer Montagu	(R)
1994	Post-classical humanistic studies	Susan Nicassio
1994	Historic preservation & conservation	Bettina A. Raphael
1994	Historic preservation & conservation	Catherine Sease
1994	Classical studies & archaeology	Katherine E. Welch
1995	Visual arts	Drew Beattie
1995	Musical composition	Edmund Campion
1995	History of art	John R. Clarke	(R)
1995	Classical studies & archaeology	Anthony P. Corbeill
1995	Visual arts	Daniel Davidson
1995	Post-classical humanistic studies	Brendan Dooley
1995	Landscape architecture	Gary R. Hilderbrand
1995	History of art	Peter J. Holliday
1995	Architecture	Sanda D. Iliescu
1995	Post-classical humanistic studies	Daniel Javitch	(R)
1995	Post-classical humanistic studies	James Lattis
1995	Classical studies & archaeology	Susann Sowers Lusnia
1995	History of art	Diana Minsky
1995	Classical studies & archaeology	Jenifer Neils	(R)
1995	Visual arts	Cliffton S. Peacock
1995	Historic preservation & conservation	Thomas C. Roby
1995	Landscape architecture	Leslie A. Ryan
1995	Visual arts	Judith Shea
1995	Visual arts	Michelle Stuart	(R)
1995	Musical composition	Francis B. Thorne	(R)
1995	Design	Kevin Walz
1995	Visual arts	Jack Youngerman	(R)
1996	Classical studies & archaeology	Fred C. Albertson
1996	Visual arts	Chuck Close	(R)
1996	Design	Coleman Coker
1996	Literature	Henri Cole
1996	Classical studies & archaeology	Robert J. Cro
1996	Musical composition	Nathan Currier
1996	Visual arts	Eric Fischl	(R)
1996	History of art	Marc Fumaroli	(R)
1996	Architecture	Michael Isaac Gruber
1996	Visual arts	Douglas Erskine Hall
1996	Classical studies & archaeology	Christopher Hugh Hallett
1996	Architecture	George E. Hartman	(R)
1996	Architecture	Allan B. Jacobs	(R)
1996	Post-classical humanistic studies	Lester K. Little	(R)
1996	Historic preservation & conservation	Anne Frances Maheux
1996	Architecture	Anne Munly
1996	Post-classical humanistic studies	William Linden North
1996	Visual arts	Manuel J. S. Ocampo
1996	Historic preservation & conservation	Pablo Ojeda-O'Neill
1996	Landscape architecture	Peter Joseph O'Shea
1996	Classical studies & archaeology	Holt Parker
1996	Design	Thomas McGehee Phifer
1996	Classical studies & archaeology	Pietro Pucci	(R)
1996	Musical composition	David Charles Randolph
1996	Post-classical humanistic studies	David E. Rutherford
1996	History of art	Maria Saffiotti Dale
1996	History of art	Marla Stone
1996	Visual arts	Eve Leslie Sussman
1996	History of art	Richard J. Tuttle
1996	Landscape architecture	Gail Eileen Wittwer
1996	Architecture	Evans Woollen, III	(R)
1997	Architecture	Kimberly A. Ackert
1997	History of art	Lilian Armstrong	(R)
1997	Visual arts	Ross Bleckner	(R)
1997	Design	Paul M. Bray
1997	History of art	Cammy Brothers
1997	Architecture	Robert Campbell	(R)
1997	Classical studies & archaeology	Jenny Strauss Clay	(R)
1997	History of art	Jeffrey L. Collins
1997	Classical studies & archaeology	Jane W. Crawford	(R)
1997	Musical composition	Mario Davidovsky	(R)
1997	Post-classical humanistic studies	Robert C. Davis
1997	Classical studies & archaeology	Gary Farney
1997	History of art	Peter J. Fergusson	(R)
1997	Classical studies & archaeology	Bernard D. Frischer	(R)
1997	Classical studies & archaeology	Brien K. Garnand
1997	Historic preservation & conservation	Eric Gordon
1997	Classical studies & archaeology	Robert Gurval
1997	Landscape architecture	Walter Hood
1997	Visual arts	Sharon Horvath
1997	Visual arts	David Ireland	(R)
1997	Visual arts	Roberto Juarez
1997	Post-classical humanistic studies	Samantha Kelly
1997	Literature	Randall Kenan
1997	History of art	Dale Kinney	(R)
1997	Musical composition	Arthur Levering
1997	Classical studies & archaeology	Francesca Santoro l'Hoir
1997	Visual arts	Marcia Lyons
1997	Design	Mark Robbins
1997	Classical studies & archaeology	H. Alan Shapiro	(R)
1997	Landscape architecture	James L. Wescoat
1997	Historic preservation & conservation	George Wheeler
1997	Architecture	Nichole Wiedemann
1997	Post-classical humanistic studies	Ronald G. Witt
1997	History of art	Lila Yawn
1998	Visual arts	Douglas Argue
1998	Landscape architecture	Elise Brewster
1998	History of art	Malcolm Campbell	(R)
1998	Architecture	Daniel Castor
1998	Design	Paul Davis
1998	Historic preservation & conservation	David G. De Long
1998	Visual arts	Agnes Denes
1998	Classical studies & archaeology	Sheila Dillon
1998	Visual arts	Jim Dine	(R)
1998	Historic preservation & conservation	Shelley Fletcher
1998	Post-classical humanistic studies	Alison Frazier
1998	Post-classical humanistic studies	Maria G. Fuller
1998	Landscape architecture	Richard Haag	(R)
1998	Landscape architecture	Mary Margaret Jones
1998	Visual arts	Charles LeDray
1998	Musical composition	Tania J. Leon	(R)
1998	History of art	John Marciari
1998	History of art	Tod Marder
1998	Classical studies & archaeology	Myles McDonnell
1998	Literature	Fae Myenne Ng
1998	Musical composition	P.Q. Phan
1998	Visual arts	Martin Puryear	(R)
1998	Design	Samina Quraeshi	(R)
1998	Musical composition	Andrew Rindfleisch
1998	Design	Mark Schimmenti
1998	History of art	Vincent Scully	(R)
1998	Architecture	Catherine Seavitt
1998	Historic preservation & conservation	Frederick Steiner
1998	History of art	David Stone
1998	Classical studies & archaeology	Jennifer Trimble
1998	Classical studies & archaeology	Charles Witke	(R)
1998	Post-classical humanistic studies	Laura Wittman
1998	History of art	Fikret K. Yegul	(R)
1999	History of art	William Barcham
1999	Post-classical humanistic studies	Phyllis Pray Bober	(R)
1999	Classical studies & archaeology	Susan Boynton
1999	Post-classical humanistic studies	Katharine Brophy Dubois
1999	Classical studies & archaeology	Michael Shane Butler
1999	Design	Michael B. Cadwell
1999	Design	Heather Carson
1999	History of art	Maria Ann Conelli	(R)
1999	History of art	Michael Fried	(R)
1999	Literature	Eli Gottlieb
1999	Post-classical humanistic studies	Tamara Griggs
1999	Classical studies & archaeology	Kim Hartswick
1999	Visual arts	Anthony Hernandez
1999	Post-classical humanistic studies	Carl Ipsen
1999	Musical composition	Betsy Jolas	(R)
1999	Classical studies & archaeology	Michael Koortbojian
1999	Classical studies & archaeology	Margaret Laird
1999	Literature	Tom Leader
1999	History of art	Stephanie Leone
1999	Architecture	Paul Lewis
1999	Architecture	Maya Lin	(R)
1999	History of art	Catherine McCurrach
1999	Classical studies & archaeology	Timothy J. Moore
1999	Visual arts	Pat Oleszko
1999	History of art	Todd Olson
1999	Classical studies & archaeology	Lauren Hackworth Petersen
1999	Visual arts	Ellen Phelan	(R)
1999	Historic preservation & conservation	Leslie Rainer
1999	Classical studies & archaeology	Kenneth J. Reckford	(R)
1999	Visual arts	Jack J. Risley
1999	Architecture	Richard Rosa
1999	Visual arts	Joel Shapiro	(R)
1999	Musical composition	Christopher Theofanidis
1999	Historic preservation & conservation	Jonathan Lee Thornton
1999	Landscape architecture	Craig Verzone
1999	Literature	Wendy Wasserstein	(R)
1999	Musical composition	Mark Wingate
2000	Literature	Tom Andrews
2000	Classical studies & archaeology	Darius A. Arya
2000	Historic preservation & conservation	Elmo Baca
2000	Musical composition	Martin Bresnick	(R)
2000	Post-classical humanistic studies	Douglas H.M. Carver
2000	Musical composition	Shih-Hui Chen
2000	Post-classical humanistic studies	Thomas J. Dandelet
2000	Visual arts	David Fludd
2000	Post-classical humanistic studies	Paul A. Garfinkel
2000	Architecture	Stephen Harby
2000	Post-classical humanistic studies	Carol Helstosky
2000	History of art	Katarzyna Elzbieta Jerzak
2000	Design	Wendy Kaplan
2000	Post-classical humanistic studies	David I. Kertzer	(R)
2000	Architecture	Johannes Knoops
2000	Visual arts	Joyce Kozloff
2000	Visual arts	Jeannette Louie
2000	History of art	Areli Marina
2000	Landscape architecture	Laurel McSherry
2000	Classical studies & archaeology	Margaret Miles	(R)
2000	History of art	Vernon Hyde Minor
2000	Classical studies & archaeology	Tina Najbjerg
2000	Historic preservation & conservation	Alice Boccia Paterakis
2000	Visual arts	Sandra S. Phillips	(R)
2000	Design	Michael Rock
2000	History of art	Ingrid Rowland	(R)
2000	Visual arts	David Salle
2000	Landscape architecture	Stephen Sears
2000	Post-classical humanistic studies	Jerrold Seigel	(R)
2000	Classical studies & archaeology	Susan T. Stevens
2000	Classical studies & archaeology	William C. Stull
2000	Architecture	Billie Tsien	(R)
2000	Architecture	Peter Waldman
2000	Musical composition	Carolyn Yarnell
2000	Classical studies & archaeology	Ann Marie Yasin
2001	History of art	Jennifer R. Bethke
2001	History of art	Patricia Fortini Brown	(R)
2001	Post-classical humanistic studies	John A. Davis	(R)
2001	Classical studies & archaeology	Leslie D. Dossey
2001	Post-classical humanistic studies	Joanna H. Drell
2001	Post-classical humanistic studies	Michael R. Ebner
2001	Classical studies & archaeology	John Curtis Franklin
2001	Visual arts	Dara Gabriella Friedman
2001	Architecture	Michael Lawrence Goorevich
2001	Visual arts	Lyle Ashton Harris
2001	Post-classical humanistic studies	Wendy B. Heller
2001	Musical composition	Michael Nathaniel Hersch
2001	Visual arts	Gary Richard Hill
2001	Landscape architecture	John Dixon Hunt	(R)
2001	Musical composition	Pierre Jalbert
2001	Classical studies & archaeology	Karen Elaine Klaiber
2001	Landscape architecture	Mark Alan Klopfer
2001	Visual arts	Donald Lipski
2001	Landscape architecture	David Bruce Meyer
2001	Classical studies & archaeology	Carlos Federico Norena
2001	Literature	Sigrid Nunez
2001	Design	Michael Jerome Palladino
2001	Design	Lisa Krohn
2001	Classical studies & archaeology	Christine G. Perkell	(R)
2001	History of art	Charles Michael Rosenberg
2001	Post-classical humanistic studies	H. Darrel Rutkin
2001	Architecture	Richard Taransky
2001	History of art	Stefanie Walker
2001	Historic preservation & conservation	Elizabeth Walmsley
2001	Literature	Rosanna Warren	(R)
2001	Historic preservation & conservation	RDeirdre Maureen Windsor
2001	Classical studies & archaeology	Paul Andrew Zissos
2002	Post-classical humanistic studies	Karl Appuhn
2002	Visual arts	Scott Michael Attie
2002	Post-classical humanistic studies	Pamela Ballinger
2002	Musical composition	Derek Bermel
2002	Musical composition	Martin Brody	(R)
2002	Landscape architecture	Andrew Thanh-Son Cao
2002	History of art	Michael Cole
2002	Visual arts	Kevin Jerome Everson
2002	Design	William H. Fain
2002	Post-classical humanistic studies	Carmela Vircillo Franklin	(R)
2002	Classical studies & archaeology	Kirk Freudenburg
2002	Visual arts	Vanalyne Green
2002	Literature	Mark Halliday
2002	Visual arts	Gerald Kim Jones
2002	Literature	Vincent Katz
2002	Post-classical humanistic studies	Thomas Forrest Kelly	(R)
2002	Architecture	Evelyn Tickle & Alexander Kitchin
2002	Classical studies & archaeology	Lynne Lancaster
2002	Literature	Frank McCourt	(R)
2002	Visual arts	Robert Moskowitz	(R)
2002	Classical studies & archaeology	Josiah Osgood
2002	Landscape architecture	Peter Osler
2002	History of art	Steven F. Ostrow
2002	Post-classical humanistic studies	Gabriel Pihas
2002	Architecture	Kelly D. Powell
2002	History of art	Shilpa Prasad
2002	Musical composition	Kevin M. Puts
2002	Classical studies & archaeology	Adam Rabinowitz	(R)
2002	Visual arts	Elizabeth Riorden
2002	Post-classical humanistic studies	Barbara H. Rosenwein	(R)
2002	Architecture	Adele Naude Santos	(R)
2002	Classical studies & archaeology	Kristina M. Sessa
2002	Design	Paul Shaw
2002	Preservation and Conservation	Ellen Phillips Soroka
2002	Post-classical humanistic studies	Randolph Starn	(R)
2002	Architecture	Evelyn Tickle
2002	Post-classical humanistic studies	Carol Whang
2003	Design	Donald James Albrecht
2003	Architecture	Rachel Moore Allen
2003	Ancient studies	Sinclair Bell
2003	Ancient studies	Rebecca Ruth Benefiel
2003	Visual arts	Linda Marie Besemer
2003	Visual arts	Vija Celmins
2003	Literature	Jennifer Scott Clarvoe
2003	Renaissance & early modern	Wietse De Boer
2003	Modern Italian studies	Mary Sharon Gibson
2003	Medieval studies	Caroline Jane Goodson
2003	Historic preservation & conservation	Eleanor Esser Gorski
2003	Renaissance & early modern	Kenneth Veld Gouwens
2003	Architecture	Margaret Helfand
2003	Landscape architecture	Joel Barton Katz
2003	Musical composition	Mark Frode Kilstofte
2003	Historic preservation & conservation	Randolph Langenbach
2003	Ancient studies	Elizabeth Mae Marlowe
2003	Medieval studies	Marian Michele Mulchahey
2003	Visual arts	Pat Oleszko	(R)
2003	Ancient studies	Peter O'Neill
2003	Literature	Peter Maxwell Orner
2003	History of art	Shilpa Prasad
2003	Renaissance & early modern	David Quint	(R)
2003	Musical composition	Ned Rorem	(R)
2003	Musical composition	David William Sanford
2003	Visual arts	John Arnold Schlesinger
2003	Landscape architecture	A. Paul Seck
2003	Visual arts	Maureen Selwood
2003	Visual arts	Arthur Simms
2003	Literature	William Jay Smith	(R)
2003	Modern Italian studies	Frank M. Snowden III	(R)
2003	Classical studies & archaeology	David Soren	(R)
2003	Medieval studies	Hiroshi Takayama	(R)
2003	Modern Italian studies	Molly Rebecca Tambor
2003	Design	Edward Weinberger
2003	Renaissance & early modern	Christopher Wood
2003	Ancient studies	James Lewis Woolard
2003	Medieval studies	Shona Kelly Wray
2003	Architecture	Andrew Evaristo Zago
2004	Literature	Sarah Arvio
2004	Landscape architecture	Cheryl L. Barton
2004	Musical composition	Mason Bates
2004	Historic preservation & conservation	Charles A. Birnbaum
2004	Musical composition	William Bolcom	(R)
2004	Architecture	David M. Childs	(R)
2004	Ancient studies	Catherine Chin
2004	Visual arts	Diana Cooper
2004	Architecture	J. Yolande Daniels
2004	Renaissance & early modern	Jill Johnson Deupi
2004	Medieval studies	Mary Harvey Doyno
2004	Renaissance & early modern	Roger Freitas
2004	Medieval studies	David Hodes Friedman	(R)
2004	Musical composition	Jefferson Friedman
2004	Visual arts	Maria Elena Gonzalez
2004	Renaissance & early modern	Anthony Grafton	(R)
2004	Modern Italian studies	Vivien Mary Greene
2004	Visual arts	Jenny Holzer	(R)
2004	Renaissance & early modern	Christopher M.S. Johns	(R)
2004	Renaissance & early modern	Thomas DaCosta Kaufmann
2004	Design	Reed Kroloff
2004	Visual arts	Matvey Levenstein
2004	Renaissance & early modern	Pamela Olivia Long
2004	Modern Italian studies	Adrian Lyttelton	(R)
2004	Landscape architecture	Alexander Stokes MacLean
2004	Ancient studies	Elizabeth Mae Marlowe
2004	Classical studies & archaeology	Miranda C. Marvin	(R)
2004	Historic preservation & conservation	T.K. McClintock
2004	Ancient studies	Kristina Lynn Milnor
2004	Medieval studies	Victoria M. Morse
2004	Ancient studies	Richard Theodore Neer
2004	Visual arts	John Newman
2004	Architecture	Richard Olcott
2004	Architecture	Linda Pollak
2004	Architecture	Nancy Goslee Power	(R)
2004	Landscape architecture	Joseph J. Ragsdale
2004	Modern Italian studies	Jonah Sebastian Siegel
2004	Ancient studies	Justin St. P. Walsh
2004	Literature	Joshua Weiner
2004	Design	Susan Anne Yelavich
2005	Modern Italian studies	Sean Sheridan Anderson
2005	Renaissance & early modern	Albert Russell Ascoli
2005	Renaissance & early modern	Paul Barolsky	(R)
2005	Musical composition	Steven Burke
2005	Renaissance & early modern	Mario Carpo	(R)
2005	Medieval studies	Michael Scott Cuthbert
2005	Classical studies & archaeology	Eve D'Ambra	(R)
2005	Visual arts	James Lucky DeBellevue
2005	Literature	Anthony Doerr
2005	Medieval studies	Steven A. Epstein	(R)
2005	Medieval studies	David Norrell Foote
2005	Architecture	Charles Gwathmey	(R)
2005	Renaissance & early modern	A. Katie Harris
2005	Architecture	John Hartmann
2005	Architecture	Michael Adam Herrman
2005	Ancient studies	Jennifer Ledig Heuser
2005	Musical composition	Lee Hyla	(R)
2005	Renaissance & early modern	Janna Israel
2005	Landscape architecture	Sarah Todd Kuehl
2005	Ancient studies	Maura Keyne Lafferty
2005	Design	Peter Michael Lynch
2005	Renaissance & early modern	Jessica Maier
2005	Musical composition	Harold Meltzer
2005	Ancient studies	Rebecca Marie Molholt
2005	Visual arts	Franco Mondini-Ruiz
2005	Medieval studies	Reinhold C. Mueller	(R)
2005	Literature	Azar Nafisi	(R)
2005	Ancient studies	David Petrain
2005	Landscape architecture	Jon Piasecki
2005	Visual arts	Jackie Saccoccio
2005	Ancient studies	Celia Ernestina Schultz
2005	Ancient studies	Emma Jane Scioli
2005	Historic preservation & conservation	John William Shank
2005	Historic preservation & conservation	Anthony Brian Sigel
2005	Visual arts	Laurie Simmons	(R)
2005	Modern Italian studies	Noa Steimatsky
2005	Visual arts	George Stoll
2005	Design	Allan Wexler
2005	Literature	Lisa Williams
2006	Visual arts	Laurie Anderson	(R)
2006	Literature	Craig Arnold
2006	Landscape architecture	Richard D. Barnes
2006	Modern Italian studies	Patrick V. Barron
2006	Modern Italian studies	Christopher G. Bennett
2006	Landscape architecture	Anita Berrizbeitia
2006	Humanities	John Bodel	(R)
2006	Musical composition	Susan Botti
2006	Ancient studies	Kimberly Bowes
2006	Design	Constantin Boym	(R)
2006	Visual arts	Boyce Cummings
2006	Historic preservation & conservation	Paola M. De Cristofaro
2006	Ancient studies	Hendrik William Dey
2006	Modern Italian Studies	Patricia L. Gaborik
2006	Ancient studies	Carlos R. Galvao-Sobrinho
2006	Medieval studies	Patrick J. Geary	(R)
2006	Literature	Aaron Hamburger
2006	Design	Pamela Hovland
2006	Renaissance & early modern	Janna Israel
2006	Visual arts	Yun-Fei Ji
2006	Ancient studies	Jacob A. Latham
2006	Ancient studies	Sandra K. Lucore
2006	Medieval Studies	F. Thomas Luongo
2006	Musical composition	Charles Norman Mason
2006	Renaissance & early modern	Peter A. Mazur
2006	Ancient studies	David Eric Petrain
2006	Humanities	John A. Pinto	(R)
2006	Humanities	JPierre D. L. R. du Pret	(R)
2006	Literature	Francine Prose	(R)
2006	Renaissance & early modern	Jana Condie-Pugh
2006	Historic preservation & conservation	Robert E. Saarnio
2006	Architecture	Alex Schweder
2006	Visual arts	Ward Shelley
2006	Architecture	Elisa Silva
2006	Music	Steven Stucky	(R)
2006	Visual arts	Carrie Mae Weems
2006	Renaissance & early modern	Emily Wilson
2006	Design	J. Meejin Yoon
2007	Literature	Tom Bissell
2007	History of art	Sible de Blaauw	(R)
2007	Visual arts	Patricia Cronin
2007	Design	Adriana Cuéllar
2007	Ancient studies	Hendrik William Dey
2007	Visual arts	Mildred and Martin Friedman	(R)
2007	Modern Italian studies	Flora Ghezzo
2007	Modern Italian studies	Victoria de Grazia	(R)
2007	Historic preservation & conservation	Pamela Hatchfield
2007	Historic preservation & conservation	Meisha Hunter
2007	Design	Dennis Y. Ichiyama
2007	Ancient studies	Michael J. Johnson
2007	Visual arts	John Kelly
2007	Literature	Dave King
2007	Ancient studies	Christine Kondoleon	(R)
2007	Journalism	Jane Kramer	(R)
2007	Ancient studies	Sandra K. Lucore
2007	Medieval studies	Christopher MacEvitt
2007	Renaissance & early modern	Margaret Meserve
2007	Ancient studies	Lisa Marie Mignone
2007	Visual arts	Joshua Mosley
2007	Landscape architecture	Willett Moss
2007	Musical composition	Andrew Norman
2007	Landscape architecture	Jose D. Parral Jr.
2007	Renaissance & early modern	Gerard Passannante
2007	Modern Italian studies	Stephanie Pilat
2007	History of Architecture	Martha Pollak	(R)
2007	Architecture	James Stewart Polshek	(R)
2007	Modern Italian studies	Hilary Poriss
2007	Visual arts	Richard Rezac
2007	Musical composition	Bernard Rands	(R)
2007	Medieval studies	Marina Rustow
2007	Modern Italian studies	Arman Raphael Schwartz
2007	Historic preservation & conservation	Jeanne Marie Teutonico	(R)
2007	Architecture	Patrick Tighe
2007	Architecture	Thomas Tsang
2007	Musical composition	Ken Ueno
2007	Ancient studies	Kevin Uhalde
2007	Visual arts	Ursula von Rydingsvard	(R)
2007	Landscape architecture	Charles Waldheim
2007	Renaissance & early modern	Gregory Waldrop
2008	Modern Italian studies	Paul Arpaia
2008	Landscape architecture	Alan Berger
2008	Visual arts	Daniel Bozhkov
2008	Medieval studies	Caroline Walker Bynum
2008	Design	John Cary
2008	Ancient studies	Robert R. Chenault
2008	Ancient studies	Elizabeth Ann Clark	(R)
2008	History of art	Michael Conforti	(R)
2008	Music	John Corigliano	(R)
2008	Historic preservation & conservation	Jana Dambrogio
2008	Visual arts	Tim Davis
2008	Literature	Junot Díaz
2008	Ancient studies	Jackie Elliott
2008	Design	Molissa Fenley
2008	Modern Italian studies	Christina Ferando
2008	Architecture	Frederick Fisher
2008	Musical composition	Erin Gee
2008	Visual arts	Kate Gilmore
2008	Medieval studies	Florence Eliza Glaze
2008	Literature	Jorie Graham	(R)
2008	Musical composition	Yotam Haber
2008	Visual arts	David Humphrey
2008	Architecture	Annie Han
2008	Literature	Chang-Rae Lee	(R)
2008	Literature	Sarah Manguso
2008	Renaissance & early modern	Thomas Frederick Mayer
2008	Renaissance & early modern	Daniel R. McReynolds
2008	Architecture	Daniel Mihalyo
2008	Historic preservation & conservation	John Ochsendorf
2008	Landscape	Laurie D. Olin	(R)
2008	History of art	Louise Rice	(R)
2008	Ancient studies	Eleanor M. Rust
2008	Ancient studies	Dylan Sailor
2008	Ancient studies	Michele R. Salzman	(R)
2008	Landscape architecture	Lisa Tziona Switkin
2008	Ancient studies	Rachel Van Dusen
2008	Renaissance & early modern	Gregory Waldorp
2008	Music	Olly Wilson	(R)
2008	Renaissance & early modern	Marjorie Curry Woods
2008	Visual arts	Caveh Zahedi
2008	Architecture	Peter Zumthor	(R)
2009	Ancient studies	Susan A. Curry
2009	Ancient studies	John N.N. Hopkins
2009	Ancient studies	Patricia Larash
2009	Ancient studies	Matthew Notarian
2009	Ancient studies	Hérica Valladares
2009	Architecture	Matthew Hural
2009	Architecture	Urusula Emery McClure & Michael A. McClure
2009	Design	Cathy Lang Ho
2009	Design	David Erdman
2009	Historic Preservation and Conservation	Andrew Kranis
2009	Historic Preservation and Conservation	Rosa Lowinger
2009	Landscape architecture	Chris Counts
2009	Landscape architecture	Hope H. Hasbrouck
2009	Literature	Brad Kessler
2009	Literature	Dana Spiotta
2009	Medieval studies	Carrie Beneš
2009	Medieval studies	Erik Gustafson
2009	Medieval studies	John Parker
2009	Modern Italian studies	Margaret Fisher
2009	Modern Italian studies	Gregory Tentler
2009	Musical composition	Keeril Makan
2009	Musical composition	Kurt Rohde
2009	Renaissance and Early Modern studies	Eric Bianchi
2009	Renaissance and Early Modern studies	Elizabeth McCahill
2009	Visual arts	Hisham M. Bizri
2009	Visual arts	David Humphrey
2009	Visual arts	Marie Lorenz
2009	Visual arts	Matthew Monteith
2010	Ancient studies	Scott Craver
2010	Ancient studies	Jonathan P. Conant
2010	Ancient studies	Lauren M. Kinnee
2010	Ancient studies	Susanna McFadden
2010	Ancient studies	Darian Totten
2010	Ancient studies	Lela Urquart
2010	Ancient studies	Ann Vasaly	(R)
2010	Architecture	Lars Lerup
2010	Architecture	Kiel Moe
2010	Architecture	Calvin Tsao	(R)
2010	Design	Russell Maret
2010	Design	Adrian Van Allen
2010	Design	William Drenttel and Jessica Helfand	(R)
2010	History of art	Leonard Barkan	(R)
2010	Historic preservation & conservation	Matthew Bronski
2010	Historic preservation & conservation	Jon Calame
2010	Landscape architecture	Robert Hammond
2010	Literature	Peter Campion
2010	Literature	Eliza Griswold
2010	Literature	Stephen Greenblatt	(R)
2010	Medieval studies	Aurelia D'Antonio
2010	Medieval studies	Annie Montgomery Labatt
2010	Medieval studies	Jason Moralee
2010	Medieval studies	Ronald G. Witt	(R)
2010	Modern Italian studies	Luca Caminati
2010	Modern Italian studies	Eileen Ryan
2010	Modern Italian studies	Richard Wittman
2010	Modern Italian studies	Mary Gibson	(R)
2010	Musical composition	Lisa Bielawa
2010	Musical composition	Don Byron
2010	Musical composition	George E. Lewis	(R)
2010	Renaissance & early modern studies	Kathryn Blair Moore
2010	Renaissance & early modern studies	Nick Wilding
2010	Visual arts	Terry Adkins
2010	Visual arts	Abigail Child
2010	Visual arts	Nancy Davenport
2010	Visual arts	Stephen Westfall
2010	Visual arts	Fred Wilson	(R)
