= Richard Warner (antiquary) =

English clergyman and writer (1763–1857)

Rev. Richard Warner (1763–1857) was an English clergyman and writer of a considerable number of topographical books based on his walks and his interest in antiquarianism.

== Early life ==
Richard Warner was born in St. Marylebone on 18 October 1763. His father, also Richard Warner, was a respectable London tradesman who owned the Two Civet Cats & Olive Tree, an Italian warehouse or delicatessen shop in fashionable New Bond Street.

His early education was undertaken by a Scottish nanny, but at the age of five he was separated from his happy home life and sent to a boarding school located closer to the centre of London. His removal from this unhappy environment came in about 1775 when his father retired and moved his family to the sedate town of Lymington on the south coast. There Warner was educated at Christchurch Grammar School, which was housed in a chamber high above the Lady chapel of the ancient Priory church. He there met and befriended fellow student Harry Burrard of Walhampton near Lymington, who became a distinguished naval officer. From his elevated classroom the schoolboy Warner more than once witnessed large gangs of smugglers landing their contraband on nearby Hengistbury Head in broad daylight. It was while at Christchurch that Warner became interested in antiquities and started to dig into ancient barrows. He met naturalist Gustavus Brander, who resided next to the church.

Warner decided to enter the priesthood and fully expected to attend Winchester College to pursue this career. A family friend had promised to nominate him for a foundation as soon as he became a Poser at the College, but on the very day of the entrance examination he told Warner’s father that he would instead be nominating another boy in obligation to his patron, possibly Lord Somerset, to whom he was chaplain. Warner's dreams of going on to a fellowship at New College, Oxford and subsequent ordination as a churchman were shattered. Bitterly disappointed, he remained at Christchurch for a further seven years. During this time he considered following some of his former school friends into the Royal Navy, and indeed had the option of becoming a Midshipman on board the 44-gun frigate HMS Romulus. However, an impassioned letter from his father persuaded him to reconsider and pursue a land-based career. He instead went to work in an attorney's office.

Warner started his further education late, matriculating at St. Mary's Hall, Oxford in 1787, aged 24. He stayed there for nearly three years. He had a chance to become a curate to the Rev. William Gilpin at Boldre in Hampshire, who needed Warner as he could no longer carry out his duties. Warner had, however, left Oxford without graduating, and there was a diversion: with the support of Warren Hastings, he was ordained by William Markham, Archbishop of York at Bishopthorpe, as from Magdalen Hall. After three months as curate in the village of Wales, South Yorkshire, he went on to Boldre as curate. Gilpin became a mentor to his curate, passing on to Warner his love of literature, walking and the countryside.

Later, in 1793, Warner became the Rev. Henry Drummond's curate at Fawley. By this time he had published several further books on Lymington, a transcription of Hampshire's Domesday Book entries, and a reissue of ancient cookery books including a Forme of Cury.

== Clergyman in Bath ==
Warner obtained his first position as a minister at All Saints in Bath in 1794 and after only a year he moved on to the nearby St James' Church. Warner was still writing books for both interest and profit. In 1795 a first novel, a two volume historical Gothic fiction inspired by the ruins of Netley Abbey near Southampton was published. Also in 1795, A History of Hampshire was published under Warner's name, but this is thought to be someone else's work. Now based in Bath he was able to investigate the many local antiquities and published many articles and two books on that city. Warner married in 1801 and became a father in 1802. He was at St James' Church until 1817.

In August 1796 Warner went on holiday to Wales, walking an average 26 miles a day, and recorded his travels in letters that were later published. Their success led further books on other tours, including the Scottish borders, the western counties and another tour of Wales.

William Wordsworth and his friend James Losh dined as guests of Warner in July 1798. Losh was a friend, while Wordsworth collected travel writing in the picturesque register, including works by Gilpin and Warner.

In 1804 Warner preached a sermon that proved contentious, later published under the title War inconsistent with Christianity, on Matthew 26:52. The audience included officers and men of the Bath Volunteers militia. Warner was defended by Thomas Parsons, a local Baptist minister. The sermon, for a fast day, provoked many replies, but sold well, and Warner repeated it in 1805, on the next fast day. The essay by Parsons supporting him was reprinted in 1813. In 1808, Warner published Letter to the People of England, on Petitioning the Throne for the Restoration of Peace. The prominence of these eirenic works by a Church of England cleric has led to an interpretation of a phrase in William Blake's prophetic book Jerusalem, "ask him if he is Bath or if he is Canterbury", with Warner's "peace party" represented by Bath as metonym. The suggestion is from the Blake scholar David Erdman.

== Later life ==
Warner published satirical books on Bath society under noms de plume, 1807–9. As priest, he took on also the parish of Great Chalfield in 1809, presented to it by Sir Harry Burrard-Neale: it is thought he never resided there.

In 1814 Warner started a fortnightly periodical, Omnium (the) Gatherum; or, Bath, Bristol, and Cheltenham literary repository, edited anonymously with Joseph Hunter. Just seven numbers were published. Hunter believed that "liberality of sentiment" of sentiment had held Warner back from further advancement in his clerical career, despite popular success: he supported Charles James Fox and parliamentary reform, but opposed Catholic emancipation. George Henry Law, a later Bishop of Bath and Wells, proved more sympathetic.

Warner died in 1857 and was outlived by his wife, Ann Pearson, who died in 1865. They had two daughters.

== Works ==
- A companion in a tour round Lymington (1789)
- Hampshire extracted from Domes-day book (1789)
- Antiquitates culinariae; or, Curious tracts relating to the culinary affairs of the Old English, with a preliminary discourse, notes, and illus. (1791)
- An attempt to ascertain the situation of the ancient Clausentum (1792)
- Topographical remarks relating to the South-western parts of Hampshire (1793)
- General view of the agriculture of the county of Hants (1794)
- The history of the Isle of Wight (1795)
- Netley Abbey: a Gothic story (1795)
- An illustration of the Roman antiquities discovered at Bath (1797)
- A Walk through Wales (1799)
- A walk through some of the western counties of England (1800)
- History of Bath (1801)
- A Second Walk through Wales (1800)
- A tour through the northern counties of England, and the borders of Scotland (1802)
- Chronological History of our Lord and Saviour: an English Diatessaron (1803)
- National Blessings reasons for National Gratitude
- Bath characters : or, sketches from life / by Peter Paul Pallet (1808)
- Divine Providence evidenced in the Causes, Consequences, and Termination of the late War (1814)
- A Letter to ... Henry Ryder, D.D. Lord Bishop of Gloucester, on the Admission to Holy Orders of Young Men, Holding ... Evangelical Principles, to which is Added a Biographical Sketch of the Late Rev. Archibald Maclaine (1818), with a reply in the same year from "Mephibosheth"
- Sermons on the Epistles or Gospels for the Sundays throughout the year (including Christmas-Day and Good-Friday) for the use of families and country congregations... (1819)
- Illustrations, historical, biographical and miscellaneous, of the novels by the author of Waverley: with criticism, general and particular (1823)
- Literary Recollections (1830)
- Great Britain's crisis!: reform; retrenchment; economy; the farmers and labouring poor: a letter to the Rt. Hon. Sir James Graham, Bart. (1831) JSTOR 60204077
