= David Humphrey =

American painter (born 1955)

- Born: August 30, 1955 (age 70); Augsburg Germany
- Education: Maryland Institute College of Art, New York University, New York Studio School
- Known for: painting, art criticism, sculpture
- Movement: Postmodern art, Postmodernism, Contemporary Art, Neo-expressionism
- Awards: American Academy of Arts and Letters Purchase Award (2011), Rome Prize (2008), Guggenheim Fellowship (2002)
- Website: davidhumphreynyc.com

David Humphrey (born August 30, 1955) is an American painter, art critic, and sculptor associated with the postmodern turn in painting that began in the late 1970s. He is best known for his playful, cartoonish, puzzling paintings, which blend figuration and abstraction and create "allegories" about the medium of painting itself. Humphrey holds a BFA from Maryland Institute College of Art (1977) and a MA from New York University (1980), where he studied with film critic Annette Michelson; he also attended the New York Studio School from 1996 – 1997. He has been the recipient of many awards including the Guggenheim Fellowship in 2002, the Rome Prize in 2008, and the American Academy of Arts and Letters Purchase Award in 2011. He was born in Augsburg Germany and raised in Pittsburgh, Pennsylvania. He lives and works in New York City.

== Artwork ==
In 1984 David Humphrey was included in a group exhibition with George Condo, Carroll Dunham, Kenny Scharf, and others called New Hand-Painted Dreams: Contemporary Surrealism at Barbara Gladstone Gallery, which put forward "neo-surealism" as a possible movement. His paintings were characterized in the New York Times as "surrealist-tinged" in a 1996 article on artists writing criticism. Humphrey himself has referred to his work as influenced by the ethos of neo-expressionism, surrealism, cubism, and the metaphysical tradition. His work was most influenced by, and has contributed to, the postmodern shift in painting of the 1970s–1990s, which favored fractured and heterogeneous approaches to form over the modernist preference for progress, refinement, and unity of medium and style. His work incorporates both abstract and figurative elements, often blurring them together, and draws from cartoons, amateur paintings by Dwight D. Eisenhower, old family photographs, and other unconventional sources to create stylistically heterogeneous images.

== Writing ==
David Humphrey began writing criticism in 1990 with a review of an exhibition by Jacqueline Humphries in Lusitania. Several years later he moved to Los Angeles, where he wrote for the arts magazine Art issues until 2003, when the magazine ended.

Regarding his column in Art issues, artist, critic, and curator Alexi Worth wrote that Humphrey:

"set out to write the kind of criticism he wanted to read. He would pick three shows, not necessarily the ones he liked best, but ones from which he thought he could tease 'a little thematic arc.' Each column, in other words, would be both an idea talk and a gallery walk; the idea was to integrate the two, to reconnect ideas and objects. In the face of so much faux empiricism, he wanted to keep in mind the way artists speak in one another's studios."

The short essay "Describable Beauty" (1996) is characteristic of his perspective as both an artist and critic. In it he writes about a changeable definition of beauty for contemporary art:

"I'm tempted to go against the artist in me that argues against words and throw a definition into the black hole of beauty definitions; that beauty is psychedelic, a derangement of recognition, a flash of insight or pulse of laughter out of a tangle of sensation; analogic or magical thinking embedded in the ranging iconography of desire. But any definition of beauty risks killing the thing it loves."

In 2010 Humphrey published Blind Handshake, a collection of reviews written between 1990 and 2008, which includes reviews of well known contemporary artists like Dana Schutz, Peter Saul, Robert Crumb, and John Currin. In 2020 a monograph surveying Humphrey's 40 year career was published by Fredericks & Freiser Gallery, including essays by Davy Lauterbach, Wayne Koestenbaum and Lytle Shaw, and a conversation between Humphrey and the painter Jennifer Coates.
