= Katie Hofstadter =

American artist, curator, and writer

- Born: 1981 (age 44–45); Georgia
- Citizenship: United States
- Education: University of Georgia, The New School
- Occupations: Artist, Curator, & Writer
- Website: katiehofstadter.com

Katie Hofstadter (born 1981) is an American artist, curator, and writer known for her interdisciplinary work at the intersection of technology, art, and performance. Her works often explore embodiment, consciousness, and the integration of artificial intelligence into creative practices.

== Early life and education ==
Hofstadter was born and raised in Georgia, United States. She earned a Bachelor of Arts in English and Studio Art from the University of Georgia in 2004. During her undergraduate studies, she served as Arts Editor for the Journal of Undergraduate Research and received the Governor’s Scholarship, Charter Scholarship, and National Merit Scholarship. She later received a Master of Fine Arts in Creative Writing from The New School in New York City in 2013.

== Career ==
Hofstadter’s arts career spans across multiple disciplines including visual art, performance art, and public art. She co-founded and serves as curator for the ARORA Network. She is a co-creator of the Climate Clock in Union Square, New York. She has collaborated with Memo Akten on projects including Superradiance, Boundaries and Cosmosapience which have been exhibited in venues such as Jacob’s Pillow, CTRL Gallery in Los Angeles, Outernet London, and the Venice Biennale.

Hofstadter’s work has been featured in international festivals and exhibitions, including the Tribeca Film Festival, FILE Festival in São Paulo, Athens Digital Arts Festival, and CVPR AI Art Gallery. She has staged exhibitions such as Lifelike Expanded (Cal Poly University and Vellum LA, 2023) and Metaglyphs (online, 2021), and has participated in residencies and commissions at institutions including the Stochastic Labs, and the Getty PST ART program.

Hofstadter has contributed to arts education as an adjunct professor at Parsons School of Design and the Fashion Institute of Technology in New York. She has served on an MFA committee at California Institute of the Arts and on the board of the Resonance Foundation.fhttps://poetrysociety.org/poems-essays/stopping-by/stopping-by-with-katie-peyton-hofstadter Her work is held in the collections of the CertusBank (USA), The New School (NY, USA), and the Moscow Museum of Modern Art (Russia).

=== Writing and publications ===
Hofstadter has written articles on contemporary art, technology, and AI, many of which are published in media outlets including Bulletin of the Atomic Scientists, Flash Art, and others. Among her notable works include AI Isn’t Choosing Our Artistic Future, We Are (2022) and Bodies on the Blockchain (2022).

== Selected awards, residencies, and fellowships ==
Hofstadter has received merit scholarships for programs at Writers in Paradise, Eckerd College (2017), and the Noepe Center for Literary Arts (2016). Her residencies and fellowships include the GLITCH Residency in France (2024), Stochastic Labs (2024), and the Woodstock Byrdcliffe Guild (2019).
