= Franco Mondini-Ruiz =

American painter

- Known for: Installation art, Painting, Sculpture, Performance art
- Notable work: Infinito Botanica, Goya Gown, High Pink
- Awards: Rome Prize, 2005

Franco Mondini-Ruiz (born 1961) is an American artist, born in San Antonio, Texas. He lives and works in San Antonio and New York. Mondini-Ruiz has taken a variety of approaches to creating art, including installations, performances, paintings, sculptures, and short stories. New York Times art critic Roberta Smith wrote in 2005 that "his first works were installations that favored kitschy found objects, then smaller assemblages of same. Accessibility, portability and spontaneity were key concepts." His later work "questions notions of preciousness and art-market exclusivity while delivering a fizzy visual pleasure."

== Early life, education and career ==
Mondini-Ruiz is of Mexican and Italian descent. His father, who was born in Bracciano, a town 19 miles northwest of Rome, met and married the artist's mother in Texas.

According to the artist, this dual heritage was rife with racial and class conflict, and it mirrored the European conquest of the Americas, with a "superior father from European lineage, and a mixed-race, inferior mother of mestizo lineage. I grew up in the shadow of the Conquest with him ..." His family lived in a trailer in Boerne, a Hill Country town north of San Antonio. They had "incredible" food, and some "very good art" painted by his father. Mondini-Ruiz's father, who spoke several languages, interacted with "sophisticated," well-educated and well-traveled clients who lived in Boerne, with his three TV stores serving as local "cultural salons." Mondini-Ruiz's upbringing was thus a mix of "high" and "low." The family rose in class status, and Mondini-Ruiz graduated from St. Mary’s University in San Antonio, and subsequently from its law school. He remarks, "That’s where the boys of the good families went."

Mondini-Ruiz led a closeted life until 1985. He subsequently joined a network of local gay Latino artists, most of whom were older than him. He met "the most amazing people in the world," and many of them died from AIDS. The epidemic made it "cool to be Mexican because of altars ... even white people were grasping to Mexican culture because it allowed a way of dealing with death and sorrow ... we’re the best in the world. No one can touch us when it comes to death and sorrow and loss." Mondini-Ruiz describes experiencing cultural, racial, and class contradictions, which "raised his consciousness," while, for a time, he was "Franco, the wild playboy lawyer that wants to be an artist."

Mondini-Ruiz credits critic and curator Dave Hickey with discovering him. Mondini-Ruiz left the legal profession to become a full time artist in 1995.

The artist has transitioned from an emphasis on ethnic art. As he told Texas Monthly, “There was a time when I was an angry revolutionary and a lot of my art was ethnic-based, about being second-class,” he said. “In San Antonio, we were invisible in the art world.” He found more visibility with what he calls his "fine china series," which featured porcelain figurines mounted on artificial food, such as stacks of pancakes, cakes, tacos, etc. During the heyday of this series, Mondini-Ruiz says he was "the largest purchaser of artificial food in the world”. He graduated to crafting three-dimensional “couture cakes,” fashioned from layers of round canvases.

Mondini-Ruiz has fallen out with the art world: “My world does not consist of the art world at all anymore. I don’t like it; it doesn’t like me,” he explained. “It’s a vehicle for social advancement. Parties. We don’t need all those parties." He has become a "speed painter," one who rapidly completes portraits for private patrons.

In 2001 he received a grant from the Joan Mitchell Foundation. In 2004 he was an Artist-in-Residence at the McColl Center for Visual Art in Charlotte, NC. In 2005 he was received the Rome Prize and was a Fellow at the American Academy in Rome. In 2009 he was a Fellow at the Civitella Ranieri Foundation in Umbertide, Italy.

== Notable works and projects ==
=== Infinito Botanica ===
One of Mondini-Ruiz's first major projects was Infinito Botánica, a traditional shop that was transformed into an art installation. Mexican botánicas are common in his hometown of San Antonio, Texas. In the mid-90s Mondini-Ruiz purchased a botánica on South Flores street in San Antonio that had been in operation since the 1930s. He used this space to create a hybrid installation/the store, which he considered "part of a social and figurative sculpture that mixed traditional botánica fare with his own sculpture and installations, as well as with the contemporary work of local cutting-edge and outsider artists, locally made craft, folk art, cultural artifacts and junk." Mondini-Ruiz has created different site-specific versions of this project at the Center for Curatorial Studies, Bard College (1999), the Whitney Biennial (2000), the Kemper Art Museum in St Louis (2001), and the Fowler Museum at UCLA (2004-2005).

At the Whitney installation in 2000, a wall text declared that "Infinito Botánica was a place that finally allowed a space." Mondini-Ruiz said this made him cry, because the original was a place for the queer and the disenfranchised, who had formally been denied a place at the table.

=== High Pink ===
In 2005, Distributed Art Publishers published Mondini-Ruiz's book High Pink: Tex-Mex Fairy Tales. The book includes short stories set in South Texas and photographs of Mondini-Ruiz's artwork.

=== Crystal City ===
Crystal City (2009, mixed media installation including glass, crystal, silver, plastic, and ceramic objects), in the collection of the Smithsonian American Art Museum, is an ironic homage to the small town of Crystal City, where a struggle for equal rights sparked the Chicano civil rights movement in Texas. Disparate objects—crystal stemware, silverware, mirrors, and inexpensive tchotchkes—are laid out on a platform to suggest a cityscape seen from above. The work was included in the 2013 Smithsonian touring exhibit and book Our America: The Latino Presence in American Art.

=== Piñatas ===
Mondini-Ruiz has created a series of piñata versions of famous works of modern and contemporary art. These piñatas have been exhibited at the Aljira, A Center for Contemporary Art in collaboration with the Newark Museum. The exhibition Mexican Museum of Modern Art included piñata versions of works by Donald Judd, Piet Mondrian, Andy Warhol, Jeff Koons, and many other artists. A version of this series was also shown at Artpace in San Antonio under the title Modern Piñatas.

== Exhibitions ==
=== Solo Shows ===
2000 "Mexique," Museo del Barrio, New York,

1999 "Infinito Botanica," Artpace, San Antonio, TX and Bard College

1998 "Tableau Vivant," the Alamo, San Antonio, TX

=== Selected Group Shows ===
2013 Our America: The Latino Presence in American Art, Smithsonian American Art Museum, traveling exhibition

2000-2003 Ultrabaroque: Aspects of Post-Latin American Art, traveling exhibition

2000 Whitney Biennial

== Books and Catalogs ==
- Anderson, Maxwell Lincoln, J. Abbott Miller, Roy Brooks, Scott Devendorf, and Whitney Museum of American Art. (2000). Whitney Biennial: 2000 Biennial Exhibition. New York: Whitney Museum of American Art: Distributed by Harry N. Abrams, Inc.
- Armstrong, Elizabeth, Victor Zamudio-Taylor, and Museum of Contemporary Art, San Diego. (2000). Ultrabaroque: Aspects of Post-Latin American Art. La Jolla, Calif.: Museum of Contemporary Art, San Diego.
- Cuba, Nan, and Riley Robinson, eds. (2008). Art at Our Doorstep: San Antonio Writers and Artists. Trinity University Press.
- Díaz, Alejandro, Kathryn Kanjo, Rita González, and Franco Mondini-Ruiz. (2016). Alejandro Díaz: It Takes a Village. San Antonio, TX: Linda Pace Foundation.
- Friis-Hansen, Dana, and Contemporary Arts Museum (Houston, Tex). (1997). Simply Beautiful: Bill Davenport, Alejandro Diaz, David Fulton, Joe Mancuso, Franco Mondini Ruiz, Robert Montgomery, Katrina Moorhead. Houston, Texas: Contemporary Arts Museum. https://issuu.com/thecamh/docs/simply_beautiful
- Mason, Nisa Joy. (2010). “Franco Mondini-Ruiz’s High Yellow: A Collection of Allegorical Border Spaces.” Dissertation.
- Mondini-Ruiz, Franco, et al. Franco Mondini Ruiz 96.3. San Antonio, Texas: ArtPace: International Artist-in-Residence Program. (1997). ArtPace Foundation and International Artist-in-Residence Program.
- Mondini-Ruiz, Franco, and Downtown Arts Projects (New York, N.Y.). (2005). High Pink: Tex-Mex Fairy Tales. First edition. New York, NY: D.A.P./ Distributed Art Publishers.
