= Kristin Jones =

American artist

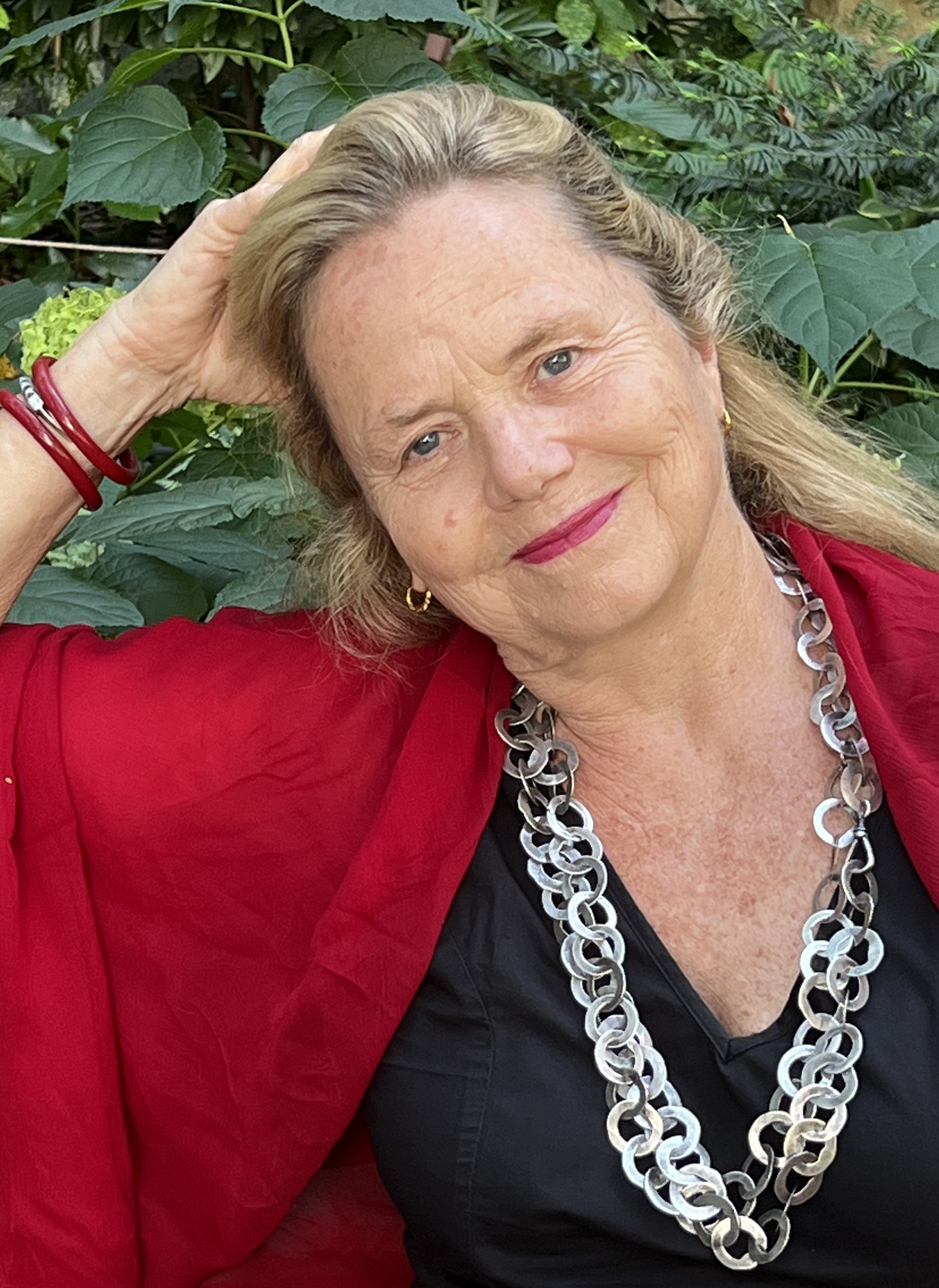
- Born: Kristin Andrea Jones; August 1, 1956 (age 70); Washington D.C., U.S.
- Education: Rhode Island School of Design (BFA) (1979); Yale School of Art (MFA) (1983)
- Known for: Public art
- Notable work: Metronome
- Spouse: Andrew Ginzel (m. 1986; div. 2021)
- Awards: Fulbright Program (1983, 2001); Pollock-Krasner Foundation (1994); Rome Prize (1994-1995)
- Website: https://www.kristinandreajones.com

Kristin Jones (born August 1, 1956 in Washington, D.C.) is an American artist. She is best known for her collaborative, large scale public art projects, installations and exhibitions in museums and galleries internationally.

== Career ==
Kristin Jones maintains both studio and public practices creating site-specific, time-based projects that work within the context of an environment and its natural phenomena. Working collaboratively across disciplines and media, she creates installations, works on and paper, and time-lapse photography. After living in Rome for sixteen years, Jones began work on TEVERETERNO, an ambitious large-scale collaboration with a multitude of artists, Roman colleagues, and with the City itself.

Jones has created numerous works for the public domain in partnership with Andrew Ginzel, notably commissions for the City of New York including Metronome for Union Square (under the auspices of the Public Art Fund and the Municipal Art Society), Oculus for the Metropolitan Transit Authority at the World Trade Center/Chambers Street Subway Station, and Mnemonics for Stuyvesant High School. Public projects beyond New York include Fathom in Ephriam, Utah, and Apposito at the University of Boulder, Colorado, among others. Their temporary installations have exhibited internationally at the Solomon R. Guggenheim Museum, the Kunsthalle in Basel and the Whitney Museum at Philip Morris. Their collaborators include Merce Cunningham, Edmund Campion and Chandralekha.

Along with Ginzel, Jones was part of the design team for the Master Plan of the Hudson River Park. Working with design professionals and technical experts directed by Quennell Rothschild Associates and Signe Neilsen, the team worked to revive the derelict waterfront of the 4.5 mile long, 550 acre park on Manhattan’s West Side. Today it exists as a prominent public destination in New York City.

Inspired by the Hudson River Park project, Jones founded TEVERETERNO in partnership with the City of Rome. She led a team of peers, city planners, and volunteers for more than a decade in creating programming that recognized the potential of the Tiber River as a resource for the City. Working from the conviction that art can be a catalyst for urban renewal, Jones acted as the visionary and creative director, inviting artists of all disciplines to collaborate on site-specific events drawing the public to the Tiber’s banks. The project launched with Jones’s monumental procession of historic She Wolves in 2005, culminated in 2016 with an epic collaboration with William Kentridge, who created Triumphs and Laments, an extraordinary 1800 foot-long frieze along the river. The unveiling was a spectacular opening event with performances conceived by Kentridge and composer Philip Miller including two processional marching bands, attended by over 15,000 people across three evenings.

Jones has exhibited internationally, including at the Museum of the City of Rome, the Venice Architecture Biennale, the Capitoline Museum in Rome, the Blue Mountain Center in upstate New York, and Lower Manhattan’s River to River Festival. Jones holds a BFA in Sculpture from the Rhode Island School of Design and a MFA from Yale University. She has been awarded fellowships by the Rockefeller Foundation, the American Academy in Rome, the Fulbright Commission, the Pollock Krasner Foundation, the Louis Comfort Tiffany Foundation, the American Center in Paris, the New York Foundation for the Arts, the New York Council on the Arts and Humanities, the Massachusetts Council on the Arts, Artists Space, Art Matters, the National Endowment for the Arts, the David W. Bermant Foundation, the New York Dance and Performance Awards, Yaddo, and the MacDowell Colony.
