= Climate Clock =

Public countdown of time until 1.5°C of global warming

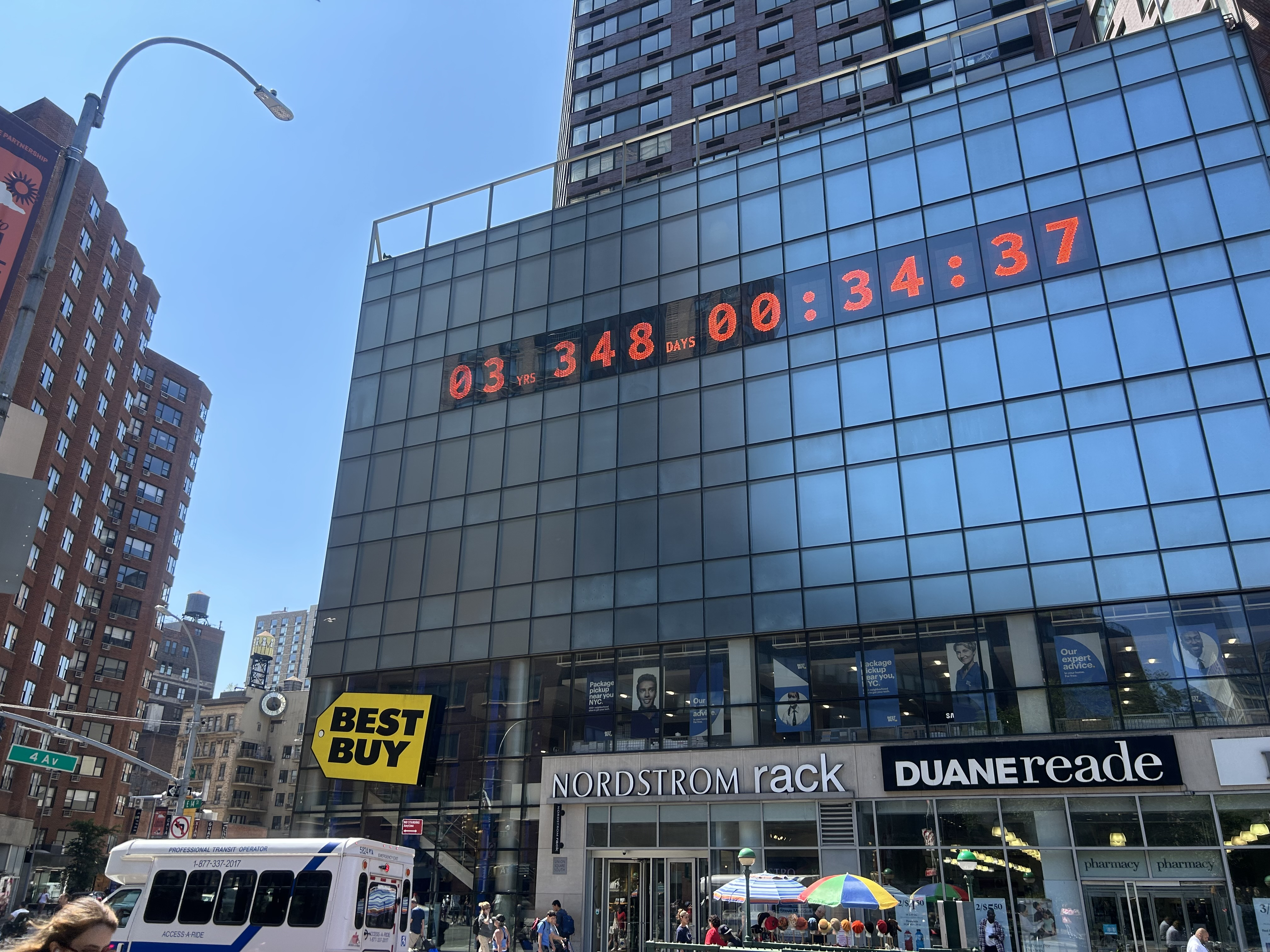
View of the Metronome clock in August 2025

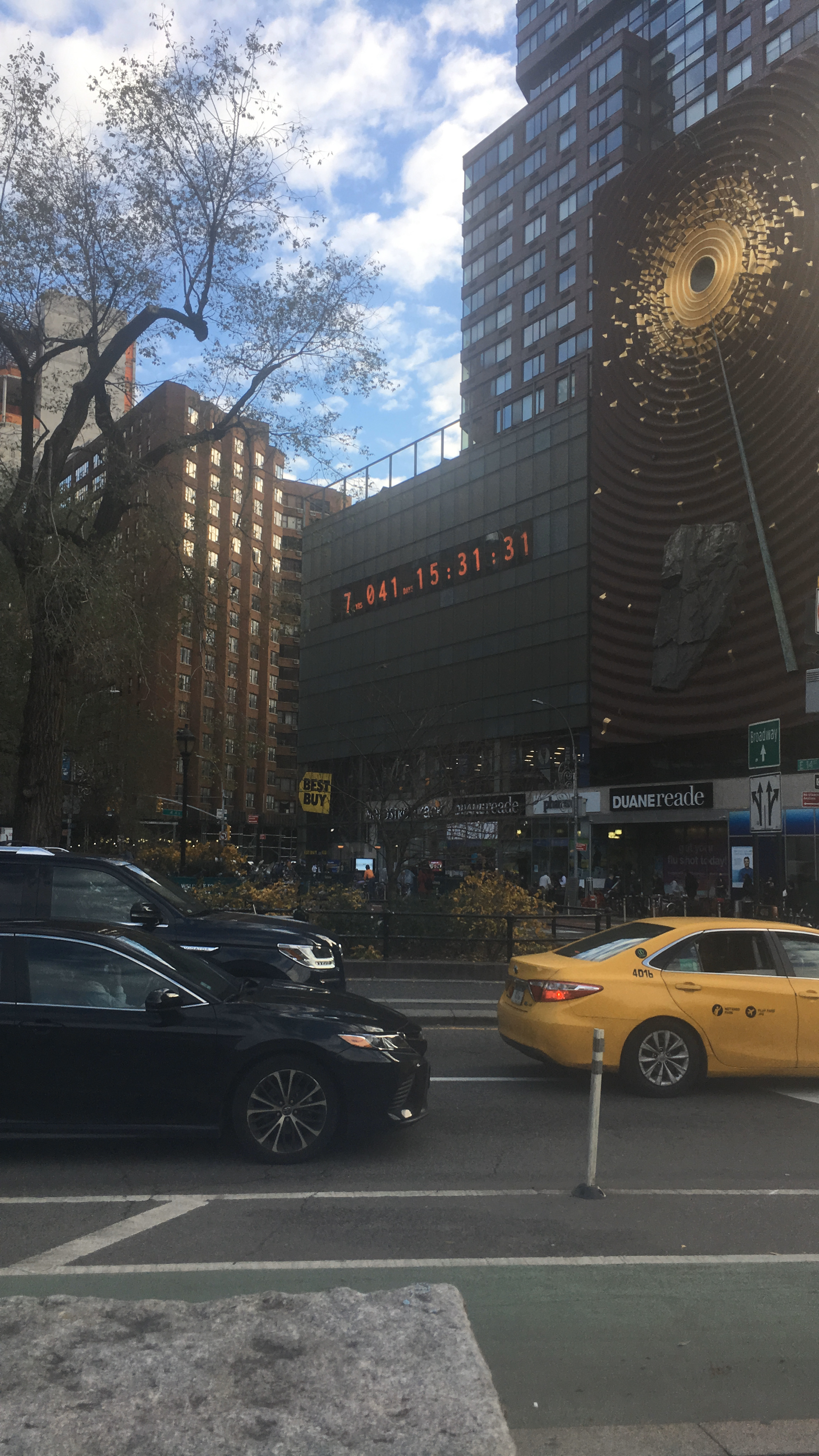
Metronome in November 2020, after the original clock was replaced with the Climate Clock

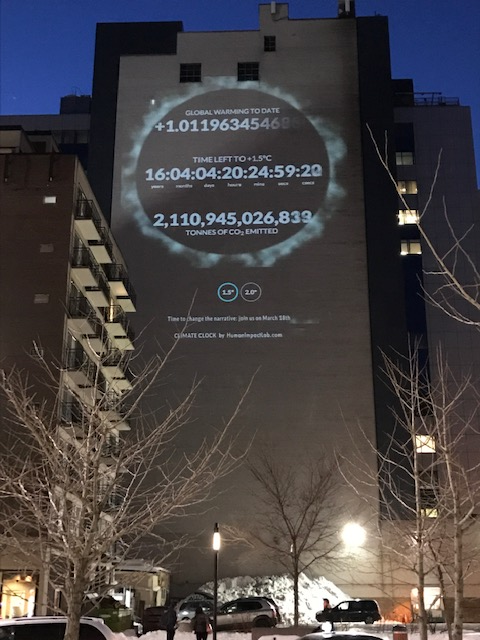
A public projection of the climateclock.net climate clock (from Concordia University and the Human Impact Lab in Montreal, Canada)

Climate Clocks are graphic representations of how quickly the planet is approaching 1.5 °C of global warming. These science communication tools show the time remaining until the earth reach important global warming levels. There are at least two public climate clock projects and websites, based on different sets of data, calculations, and assumptions.

== Relevance ==
1.5 °C is an important threshold for many climate impacts, as shown by the Special Report on Global Warming of 1.5 °C. Every increment to global temperature is expected to increase weather extremes, such as heat waves and extreme precipitation events. There is also the risk of irreversible ice sheet loss. Consequent sea level rise also increases sharply around 1.75 °C, and virtually all corals could be wiped out at 2 °C warming.

== The Montreal Climate Clock ==
The climate clock found at <climateclock.net> was launched in 2015 to provide a measuring stick against which viewers can track climate change mitigation progress. The date shown when humanity reaches 1.5 °C will move closer as emissions rise, and further away as emissions decrease. An alternative view projects the time remaining to 2.0 °C of warming. The clock also shows the amount of CO_{2} already emitted, and the global warming to date. The clock is updated every year to reflect the latest global CO_{2} emissions trend and rate of climate warming. On September 20, 2021, the clock was delayed to July 28, 2028, likely because of the COP26 Conference and the land protection by indigenous peoples. As of March 27, 2026, the clock counts down to July 21, 2029 at 12:00 PM EST (5:00 PM / 17:00 GMT).

This clock was created by David Usher and Damon Matthews and is hosted by the Human Impact Lab, itself part of Concordia University. Organisations supporting the climate clock include Concordia, the David Suzuki Foundation, Future Earth, and the Climate Reality Project.

As of July 17, 2025, the current level of global warming was 1.325 °C.

== The New York Climate Clock ==
In late September 2020, artists and activists, Gan Golan, Katie Peyton Hofstadter, Adrian Carpenter and Andrew Boyd repurposed the Metronome in Union Square in New York City into a climate clock. It is located on East 14th Street above a Best Buy. The goal was to "remind the world every day just how perilously close we are to the brink." This is in juxtaposition to the Doomsday Clock, which measures a variety of factors that could lead to "destroying the world" using "dangerous technologies of our making," with climate change being one of the smaller factors. This specific installation is expected to be one of many in cities around the world. At the time of installation, the clock read 7 years and 102 days. Greta Thunberg, Swedish environmental activist, was involved in the project early on, and reportedly received a hand-held version of the climate clock.

Since its inception, the New York Climate Clock has added a second set of numbers for the percentage of the world's energy use that comes from renewable energy sources.

== See also ==
- Climate Action Tracker
- Doomsday Clock
- Paris Agreement: limits global warming to 2 °C, pursues 1.5 °C
- Effects of global warming which further increase CO2 emissions: forest fires, arctic methane release, ...
