= Jones and Ginzel =

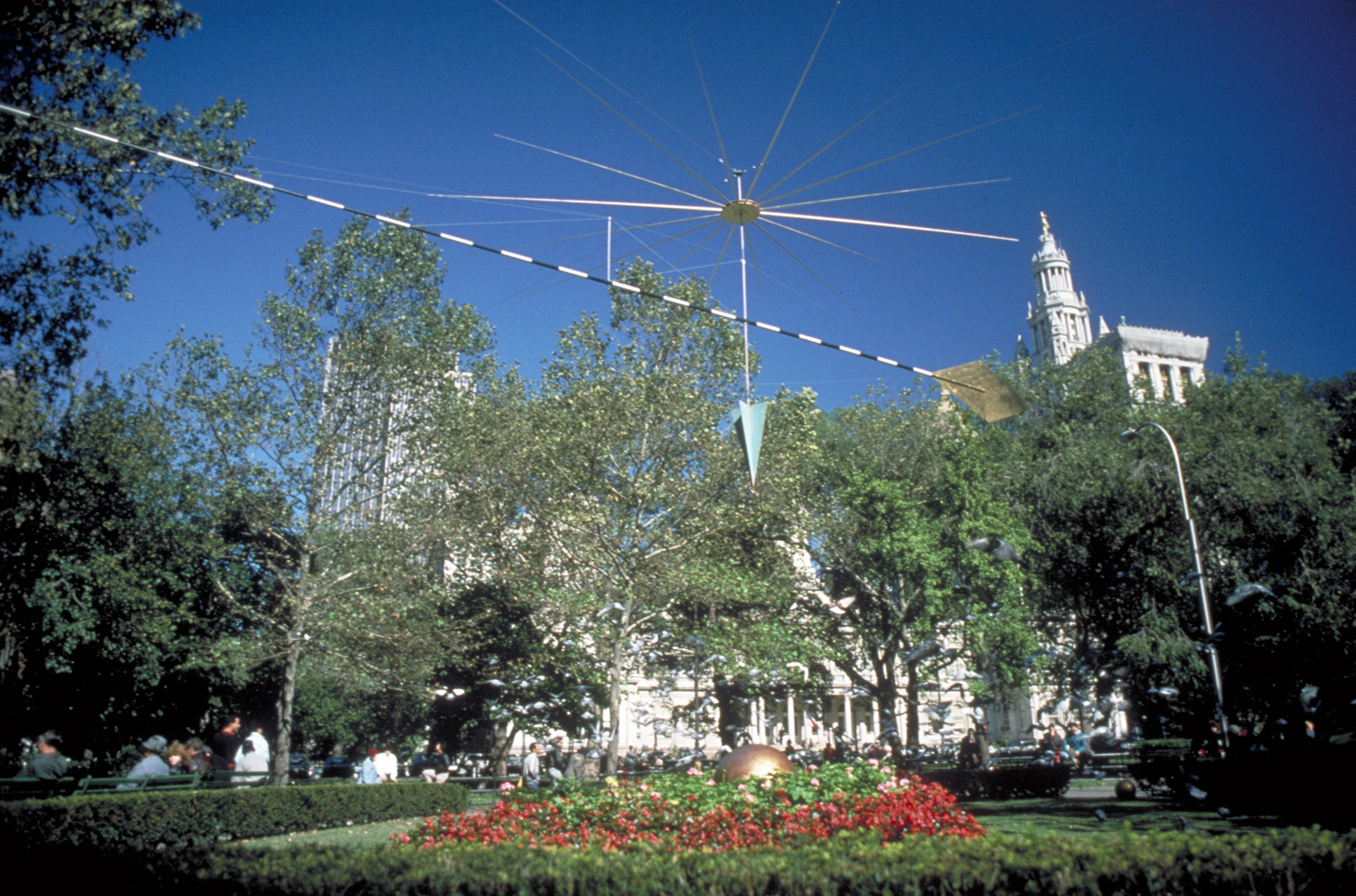
Pananemone (City Hall Park, New York, NY), 1987

Kristin Jones (born 1956 in Washington, D.C.) and Andrew Ginzel (born 1954 in Chicago) are a contemporary American artist team. Both Jones and Ginzel pursue independent careers in the arts, but they are best known for their collaborative, large scale public art projects, installations and exhibitions in museums and galleries internationally.

== Biography ==
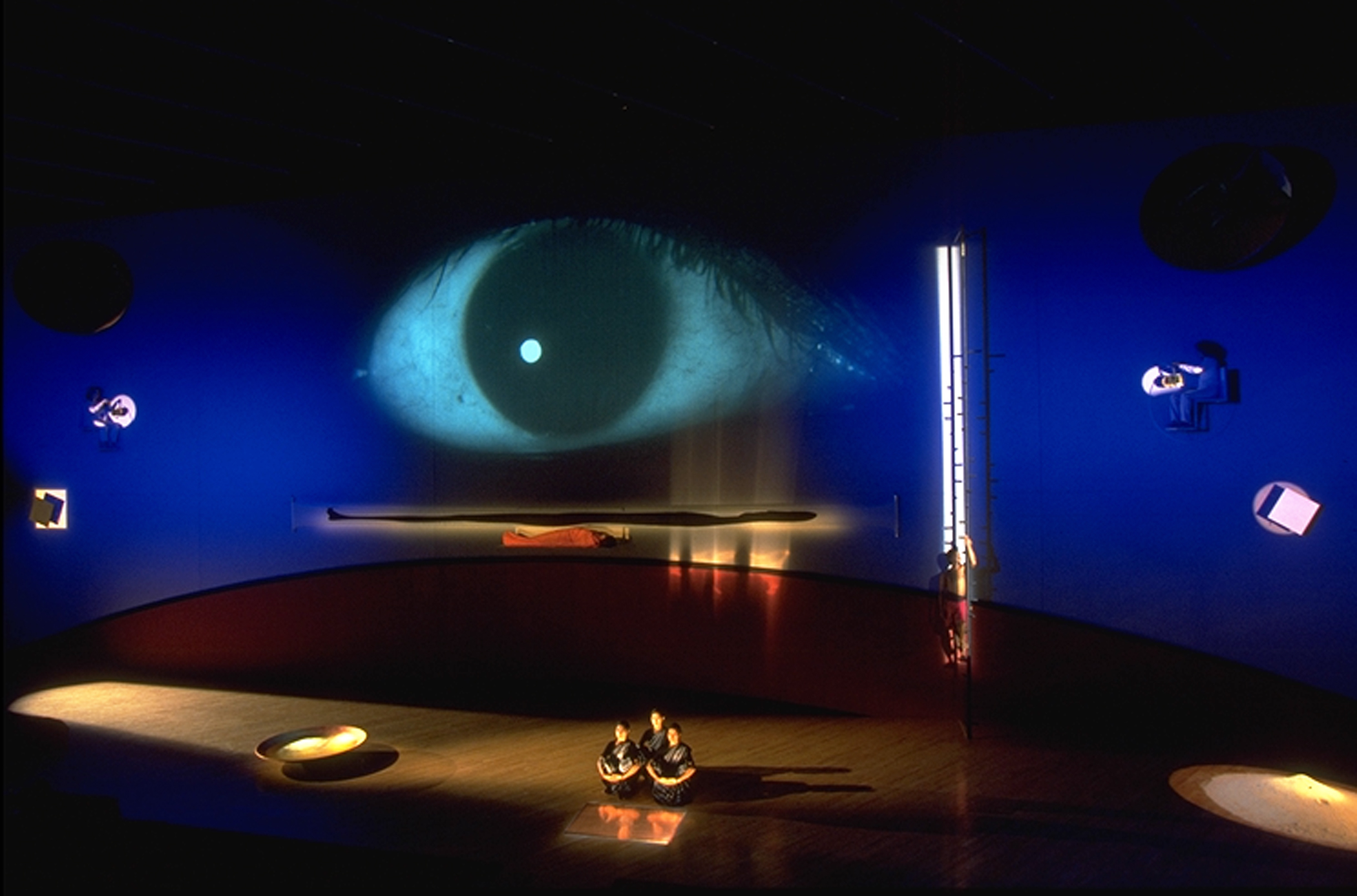
Interim (Brooklyn Academy of Music, Brooklyn, New York), 1995 (Kristin Jones / Andrew Ginzel), photo by T. Charles Erickson

Kristin Jones and Andrew Ginzel have worked collaboratively since 1985 on many commissioned private and public projects, as well as museum and gallery exhibitions internationally. Current and recent major works include the Visual Arts Complex at the University of Colorado at Boulder, the Hoboken Ferry Terminal in New Jersey, the Tiber River in Rome, and public buildings in Florida and Utah.

Site-specific installations in public institutions and spaces include the Olympics in Atlanta; in New York City at the Solomon R. Guggenheim Museum, on 42nd Street and at the Brooklyn Bridge Anchorage for Creative Time, at the P.S. 1, at the New Museum and in City Hall Park with the Public Art Fund. Nationally, they have exhibited at the Chicago Cultural Center, the Madison Art Center, the List Visual Arts Center at MIT, the Wadsworth Atheneum, and the Virginia Museum of Fine Arts. Their international exhibitions include major works the city of Rome at the Aquario Romano, for the Kunsthalle in Basel, Switzerland, at the Museo D’Arte Contemporanea in Prato, Italy, as well the Trienalle in New Delhi, India.

Besides participating in many group exhibitions, the artists have exhibited solo in galleries beginning in 1985 with Barbara Flynn and subsequently with Annina Nosei, Damon Brandt and Frederieke Taylor.

Work with performance includes a commission by the Brooklyn Academy of Music to create a collaborative work with the choreographer Chandralekha for the Next Wave Festival. Previously, they had designed sets, costumes, and lighting for the Merce Cunningham Dance Company, David Dorfman Dance Company and staging for Matthew McGuire of the Creation Company.

The artists have been commissioned to build a wide variety of major permanent site-specific works each entirely different from the next, each totally integrated into its environment. In New York City, they have worked in two schools: Stuyvesant High School in Battery Park City and at PS 102 in the Bronx. Other Percent for Art projects include works for large public buildings in Portland, Oregon, Philadelphia, Pennsylvania, and in Milwaukee, Wisconsin. They have created Metronome, for Union Square, Manhattan under the auspices of the Public Art Fund and the Municipal Art Society and Oculus, in the Chambers Street – World Trade Center / Park Place metro station.

Jones and Ginzel have received awards from the Pollock-Krasner Foundation and the Louis Comfort Tiffany Foundation. Foreign research grants have included: the Fulbright Scholar Program for research in Italy (twice), an Indo-American Fellowship for nine months of research in India, American Center Paris, Cité International des Arts, Residency, Paris. Direct project grants have included the Artists Grant, Artists Space, Art Matters, the Massachusetts Council on the Arts, the New York Council on the Arts and Humanities, and from the New York Foundation for the Arts as well as an NEA Arts in Architecture and Inter-Arts grant. Residencies have included the Rockefeller Foundation’s Bellagio, Yaddo, Ucross, Djerassi and MacDowell. Their work Adytum for Creative Time received a “Bessie” award. The National Endowment for the Arts has twice awarded Fellowships for Sculpture. Jones and Ginzel were the first co-winners of the Rome Prize.
