= Hendrik Dey =

American classicist and archaeologist

Academic background
- Education: Middlebury College; Durham University; University of Michigan

Hendrik William Dey (born 1976) is an American classicist and archaeologist. He is a professor of art and art history at Hunter College.

== Early life and education ==
Dey graduated cum laude in classics from Middlebury College in 1999. He received a Master of Arts from Durham University in 2000, and completed his Ph.D. in classical art and archaeology at the University of Michigan in 2006.

From 2005 to 2007 he was a Samuel H. Kress Foundation/Irene Rosenzweig Rome Prize Fellow at the American Academy in Rome, and during this time served as a supervisor at Villa Magna in Anagni, as well as a divemaster and supervisor at the underwater excavation of Caesarea Maritima in Israel.

== Career and research ==
Dey served as Adjunct Professor at the American University of Rome from 2007 to 2008 and then as a visiting lecturer at Johns Hopkins University. In 2010, he joined the faculty of Hunter College as an Assistant Professor, and was promoted to full Professor in 2016.

His research focuses on the urbanism and architecture of the Mediterranean between the Late Antiquity period and the Middle Ages. He is also interested in the evolution of monasticism. In 2025, his book The Making of Medieval Rome won the Premio Daria Borghese award for the best book on Rome written by a non-Italian. It was written to build on an earlier work, Rome: Profile of a City, 312–1308, by Richard Krautheimer.

== Selected publications ==
- Dey, Hendrik (2011). The Aurelian Wall and the Refashioning of Imperial Rome, AD 271–855. Cambridge University Press. ISBN 978-0-521-76365-3.
- Dey, Hendrik (2015). The Afterlife of the Roman City: Architecture and Ceremony in Late Antiquity and the Early Middle Ages. Cambridge University Press. ISBN 978-1-107-06918-3.
- Deliyannis, Deborah; Dey, Hendrik; Squatriti, Paolo (2019). Fifty Early Medieval Things: Materials of Culture in Late Antiquity and the Early Middle Ages. Cornell University Press. ISBN 978-1-5017-2589-0.
- Dey, Hendrik (2021). The Making of Medieval Rome: A New Profile of the City, 400–1420. Cambridge University Press. ISBN 978-1-108-83853-5.
