= Jeannette Louie =

- Born: 1964 New York, NY, USA
- Education: Parsons School of Design (BFA) Vermont College (MFA)
- Known for: Art, Film
- Honours: Rome Prize, American Academy in Rome Creative Capital Foundation New Jersey State Council on the Arts

Jeannette Louie (born 1964) is an American interdisciplinary artist and director of documentary and experimental films. Her work draws upon scientific and psychological conditions that influence the development of human cognition. Rumination, trauma, family histories, and the underlying effect memories have upon consciousness predominate.

== Life and Education ==
Louie was born in New York City in 1964 to immigrant parents of Chinese descent. Her father was a chemical engineer and her mother was an immigration naturalization consultant and community activist. She earned a BFA in Illustration at Parsons School of Design, NY in 1985 and an MFA in Fine Arts from Vermont College, VT in 1998. Louie attended the Skowhegan School of Painting and Sculpture in Maine in 1998.

== Early Career and Recognition ==
Louie was awarded the Rome Prize from the American Academy in Rome from 1999 to 2000 where she spent a year developing installations influenced by Euclidean perspectives and Italian Futurist Manifestos. Exhibitions of these artworks were presented at Alberto Peola Arte Contemporanea, Turin, Sala Uno, Rome, the American Academy in Rome and Esso Gallery, New York. Museum director, Holly Block stated, "There's a purity and clarity about her technique that makes her work interesting."

She received fellowships from the Creative Capital Foundation (2001), the New Jersey State Council on the Arts (Film 2026 and Sculpture 2002) and the Robert Blackburn Printmaking Workshop NEA fellowship, NY (1990).

Her work has been supported by artist residencies at Bogliasco Foundation, Italy (2023), Gapado AIR, South Korea (2018), Willapa Bay AIR, WA (2016), The Center for Photography at Woodstock, NY (2007), Yaddo (Geraldine R. Dodge Foundation Fellowship, 2002), The Marie Walsh Sharpe Foundation, NY (2002), Roswell Artist-In-Residence Program, NM (2000), P.S. 122 Space Program, NY (1997), and Sculpture Space, NY (1996).

Solo exhibitions of her installations were held at Esso Gallery, NY (2001, 2000, 1999), Mills College Art Museum, CA (2002), Urban Institute for Contemporary Arts, MI (2004) and Homie Berlin, Germany (2006). She has been included in considerable group exhibitions; The Noyes Museum of Art, NJ (2012), The Center for Photography at Woodstock, NY (2011), Platform at Kimusa, Seoul (2009), Islip Art Museum, NY (2004), Spaces, OH (2001), The Montclair Art Museum, NJ (1998), among others.

== Film and Themes ==
Louie experimented with video animation in 2009 and transitioned to filmmaking in 2013. Merging analytical inquiry with philosophical narrative, her earliest films portrayed the mind at work, attempting to comprehend Post Traumatic Stress Disorder (Amygdala, 2013), the endurance of chronic pain (Sonia Interlude, 2012) and the fetal loss of a child (Realm of an Inner Child, 2017). The science of cognition at the cellular level was fictionalized in The Land Within (2016), where a neuron questioned the existence of a soul, and in Realm of an Inner Child (2017), where the subject of fetal chimerism affecting physiological evolution was represented. These experimental films merged neuroscience with psychology in order to elucidate human interiority and cognition. Commenting upon the relationship she built between filmmaking and science, Louie has stated, "I was diagnosed with PTSD in 2006 and consequently found myself a misfit wandering about a dystopia diaspora. In order for me to understand the maddening terrain I was stumbling about in, I embarked on a quest to understand molecular identity, which led me to the language of neuroscience."

Cultural memory as perceived through family legacy was depicted autobiographically in Us Being Epic (2026), which premiered at The American Documentary Film Festival (AMDOCS). Louie examined her parents' cultural and political histories through the use of a family photographic archive - visualizing their earliest immigrant beginnings through the decades where they transformed into Asian Americans engaging in civic activism. The streaming montage of family photographs presented a stylized epic sweep through historical time. The film was part of a duet. Its partner, Empire of My Melodious Mind (2022) presented the influence of a heritage language, specifically Cantonese, as informing a moment of reverie. A stream-of-consciousness composed of stop-motion sequences combined with the redundancy of a Cantonese recitation created a panorama that simulated melodic composition.

Louie's short films have screened at film festivals in the United States, Canada, Germany, United Kingdom and Switzerland at The American Documentary Film Festival, Hot Docs Film Festival, RiverRun International, Florida International, Minneapolis-Saint Paul International, Le FIFA, Vancouver International, Montclair Film Festival, Maryland Film Festival, CAAMFest, Los Angeles Asian Pacific Film Festival, Antimatter, Aesthetica, The Black Maria, Imagine Science Films, Columbus International, Brooklyn Film Festival, Tallgrass, Seattle Asian American Film Festival, Athens International, Reel Sisters of Diaspora, among others.

Her films have been awarded by Bolton Film Festival, Tallgrass, Reel Sisters of Diaspora, WorldFest-Houston and the American Psychological Association.
