= Metronome (public artwork) =

1999 artwork by Jones and Ginzel

Coordinates: 40.7344005°N 73.9902579°W

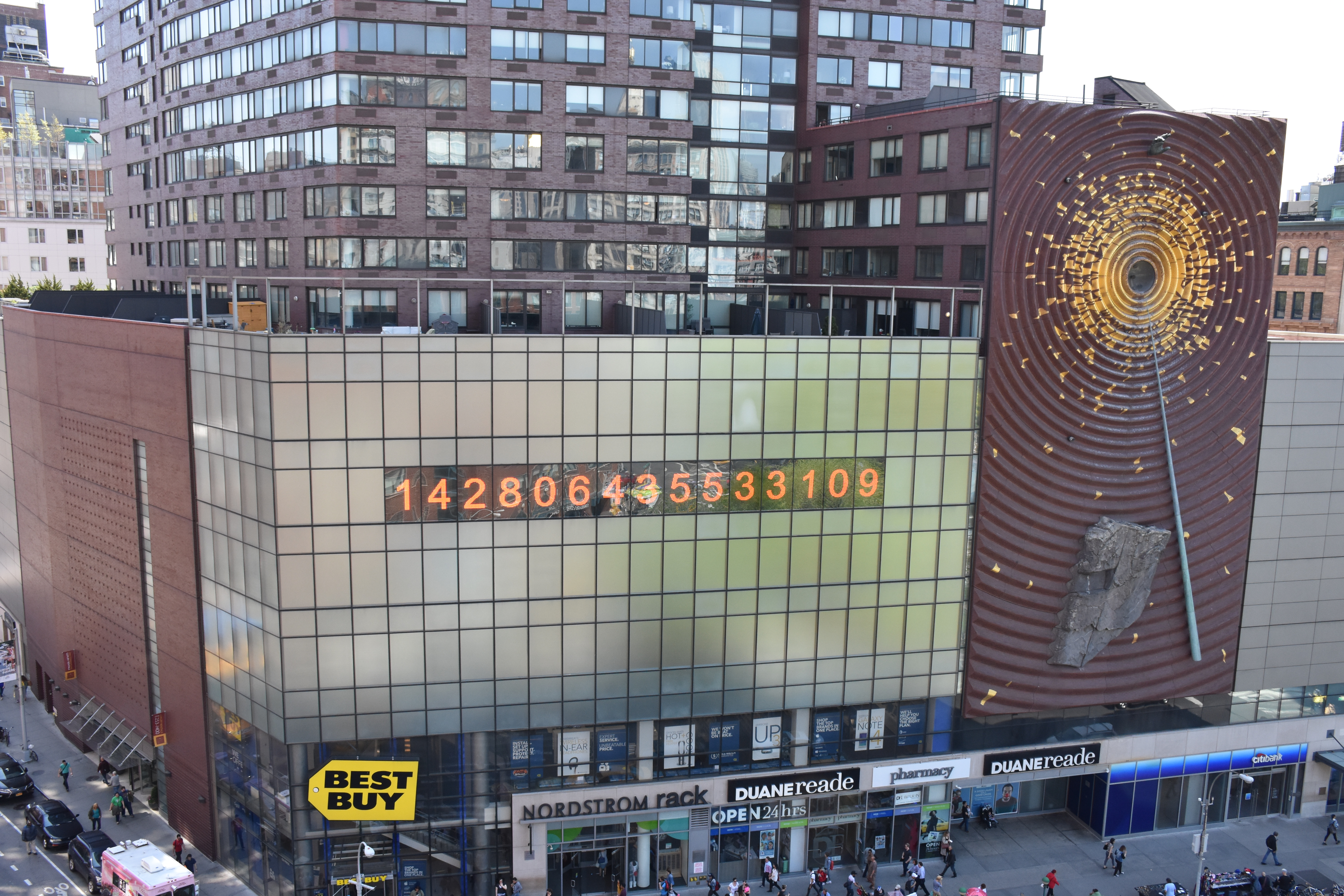
- Full view of the Metronome in 2015
- Artist: Kristin Jones and Andrew Ginzel
- Completion date: October 26, 1999 (modified September 19, 2020)
- Subject: Measurement of time
- Location: New York City, New York, United States
- Owner: Related Companies
- Website: Official website

Metronome is a large public art installation located along the south end of Union Square in New York City. The work was commissioned by the Related Companies, developers of One Union Square South, with the participation of the Public Art Fund and the Municipal Art Society. The $4.2 million provided by the developer makes it one of the largest private commissions of public art.

The artwork was created by Kristin Jones and Andrew Ginzel and consists of several sections, including a round circular void from which puffs of steam were at one point released throughout the day, and a clock made of large orange LED digits. Installation of Metronome began in February 1999, and its dedication took place on October 26, 1999. On September 19, 2020, Metronome became a climate clock showing the time remaining until the Earth's carbon budget is used up as a result of concerns related to global warming above the 1.5°C threshold that was outlined in the Paris Agreement. Devised by artists Andrew Boyd and Gan Golan, the fifteen digits counted down the years, days, hours, minutes, and seconds, in conventional 24-hour format with spaces to the left of each digit.

== The clock ==
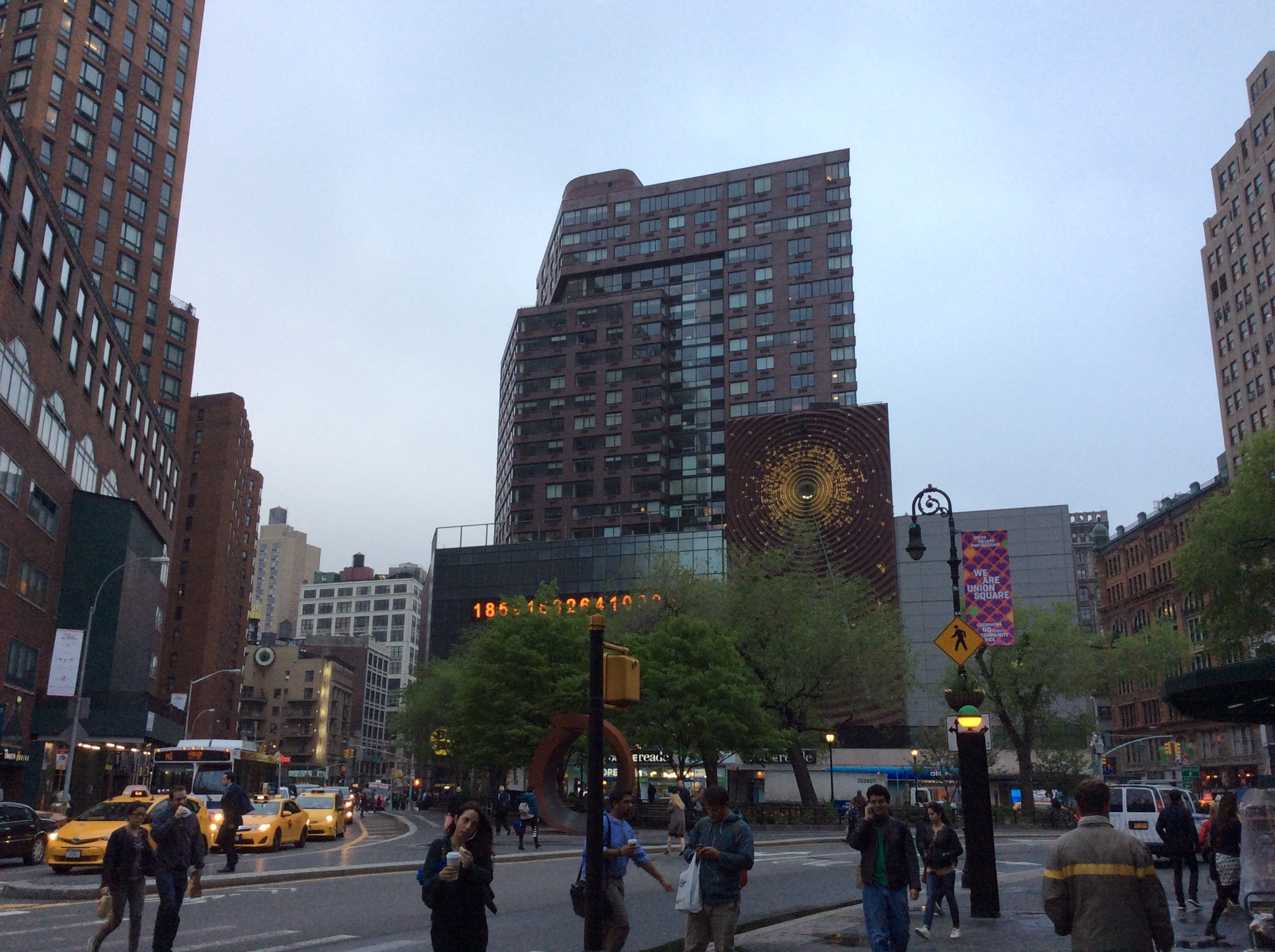
View from a distance

On the left side of the work is a set of fifteen large LED digits, called "The Passage", which display the time in 24-hour format. The seven leftmost digits show the time in conventional 24-hour format, as hours (2 digits), minutes (2 digits), seconds (2 digits), tenths of a second (1 digit). The seven rightmost digits display the amount of time remaining in a 24-hour day, as tenths of a second (1 digit), seconds (2 digits), minutes (2 digits), hours (2 digits). The center digit represents hundredths of a second. For instance, if the clock reads "195641287180304", it means that time is 19:56 (7:56 PM) and 41.2 seconds, and that there are 04 hours, 03 minutes, and 18.7 seconds remaining in the day.

For a few months in 2005, the clock on Metronome did not give the time of day, but instead counted down the time until the International Olympic Committee was to announce the host city of the 2012 Summer Olympics. New York City ultimately lost its bid to be host city to the 2012 Olympics to London.

The clock showed the wrong figures for over a year in 2010–2011 until, in June 2011, the dial-up connection it had previously used to obtain an atomic time reading was updated.

On September 19, 2020, Metronome became a climate clock as it started showing the time remaining until the Earth's carbon budget is used up as a result of concerns related to global warming above the 1.5°C threshold that was outlined in the Paris Agreement. The fifteen digits counted down the years (1 digit), days (3 digits), hours (2 digits), minutes (2 digits), and seconds (2 digits) from left to right, in conventional 24-hour format with spaces to the left of each digit. The modified display was devised by artists Andrew Boyd and Gan Golan.

== Artists' statement ==
Artists Kristin Jones and Andrew Ginzel state that:

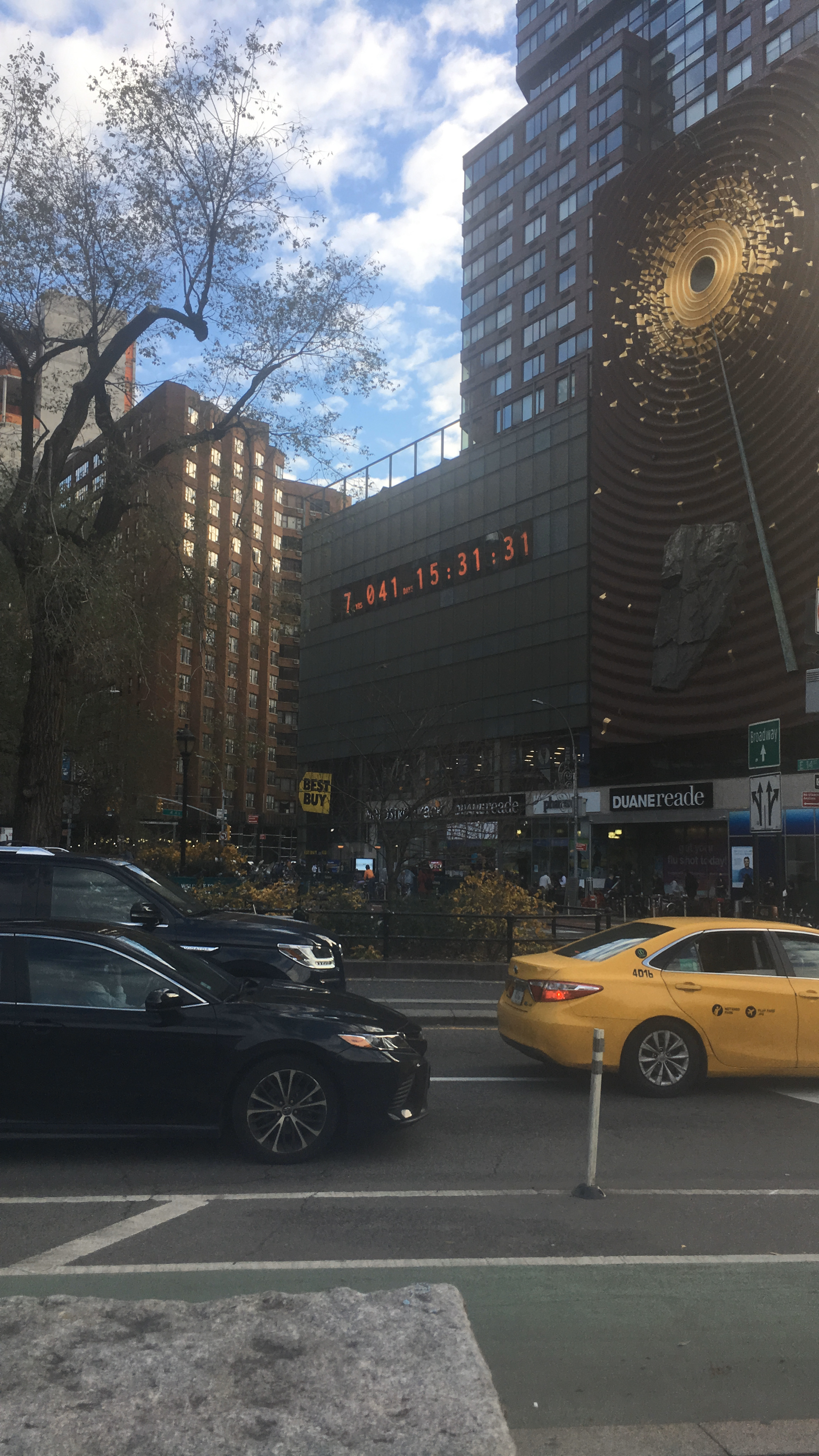
View of Metronome in November 2020, after the clock display was modified to a climate clock

Metronome is an investigation into the nature of time. The work references the multiple measures of time that simultaneously inform and confound our consciousness of the moment. The composite work intends to evoke contemplation on the dynamic flux of the city. The elements suggest the instant and infinity, astronomical sequence, geological epoch and ephemerality. Metronome is meant to be integral to the very history, architectural fabric, spirit and vitality of the city.

The elements that compose Metronome refer to and are very much a part of the place where the work exists: Union Square in the City of New York.

The central element is a brick wall built in concentric circles, creating a wave pattern like ripples on still water after a stone is cast into it, making the wall seem to undulate. Gold leaf accentuates the center of the work, a dark aperture that emanates a constant halo of steam. At noon and midnight the hole erupts with a huge plume of steam that is accompanied by an explosion of sound composed to mark the exact instant and its passage, like a noonday whistle or a public clock that marks the time.

Counterpoised below on the wall is a massive piece of bedrock, displaying the millennia of geological history. A long thin bronze cone is poised at a diagonal on the rippling brick façade: a time indicator that suggests perspective.

A large bronze hand poised high on the wall is an accurate enlargement taken from the historical statue of George Washington in Union Square Park directly below.

Left of the vertical brick center, on the glass façade of the building is a horizontal clock with pairs of digits that accurately display the hours, minutes and seconds that have passed since midnight, as well as the time remaining in a 24-hour period. Like an hourglass that contains a specific measure of sand, the digital time piece counts up on the left and down on the right, measuring both the sum and the balance of the day. The center three digits are a frenzy of intangible fractions of seconds, which reveal the pace of life in the city.

On the right metallic façade is a sphere, half black and half gold, which turns daily in synchrony with the phases of the moon. When the moon reaches fullness, the entire golden face of the orb is revealed.

Metronome contemplates time: geological, solar, lunar, daily, hourly, and momentarily, revealing the fractions of seconds in the life of a city – and of a human being.

... New York City pulses with enormous energy. There is an ever-present sense that an underlying source makes the city a hot spot, active with desire, intellect, pathos. Certain places on earth are geothermally active; Manhattan's streets release vaporous plumes from a plethora of fumaroles. The ephemerality of this steam in the streets suggests the volatility of the place. Metronome poses as a vent for this energy – an oracular center for the public to gauge their momentary presence, their mortality, from which the city can be examined as a vital infrastructure.

Viewers are confronted and reassured, confused, enlightened and asked to question the moment of their existence in relation to their natural and built environment.

Ultimately, the work is an ode to mortality and the impossibility of knowing time.

== Reception ==
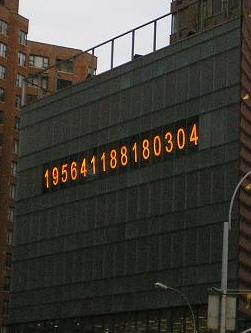
Metronome (detail – "The Passage") in 2009

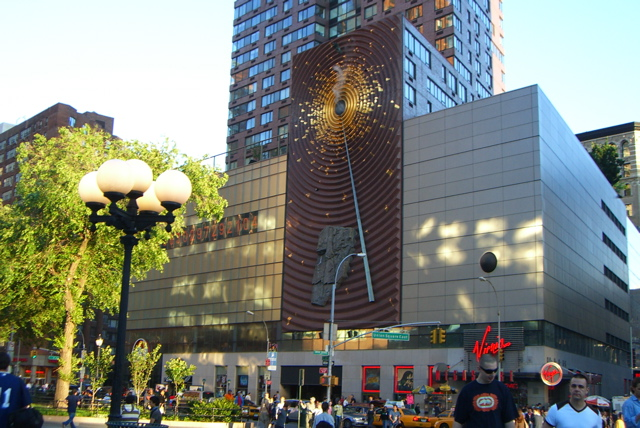
As viewed from the southern end of Union Square

Metronome and One Union Square, the building to which it is attached, have not been well received by critics or the public. Kristin Jones, co-creator of the work, complains that it is "the most unloved piece of public art in the city". Among Metronome's critics are New York Times architecture critic Herbert Muschamp, who described it as "Pretentious ... the artists' basic miscalculation was to assume that a large surface called for comparably big forms ... It's just some space in a box with a leaky hole in it." The New York Post put One Union Square at #2 on its "10 Buildings We Love to Hate" list, calling it "a grotesque modern nightmare." James Gaynor of the New York Observer wrote of Metronome, "Fail so big that no one can do anything about it ... New York now has its very own Wailing Wall, a site (and sight) of cultural pilgrimage where the death of aesthetics can be contemplated."

In various letters to the editor, the public has written of Metronome: "Well-intentioned, but ultimately flat, corporate art. It is a confounding installation based on a contrived theme ('the impossibility of knowing Time')"; "[a] gigantic waste of time, space, and money [that] seems like a satire on all public monuments"; and "a colossal waste of a facade". However, one respondent felt that Metronome was "a large and very elegant digital hourglass; time 'pours' from the numbers on the right to the left ... The other elements are likewise very thoughtful and sophisticated ruminations on time, its passage and the ways in which we mark it."

== See also ==
- Debt clock
- Doomsday Clock
