= Alexi Worth =

American painter

- Born: Alexi Worth; May 13, 1964; New York City, New York
- Education: Yale School of Art, Boston University
- Known for: Painting
- Spouse: Erika Belsey (m. 1997)
- Awards: Guggenheim Fellowship; Louis Comfort Tiffany Foundation Award; New England Foundation for the Arts Fellowship

Alexi Worth (born 1964, New York, NY) is a painter, curator, art critic, and writer who is known for his conceptually rich and visually graphic works that address modern life and artmaking. He is currently represented by DC Moore Gallery, New York, NY.

== Biography ==
Alexi was born on May 13, 1964, in New York City to parents Robert and Blaikie Forsyth Worth. His mother worked as a social worker, and his father founded a college textbook publishing company.

Worth attended the Yale School of Art, earning a BA in 1986. After attending Maine's Skowhegan School of Art in 1989, he received his MFA from the School of Fine Art at Boston University in 1993.

In 1997 Worth married architect Erika Belsey, who also attended Yale. They currently live in Brooklyn with their two sons.

== Painting ==
Worth is preoccupied with the tension between painting and photography. From his artist's statement: "Twenty years ago, we thought photography was already ubiquitous. But in fact, we’re living through a new immersion, akin to the first one of the 1850s. For painting, what does this new immersion mean? More reasons for pessimism, of course. More reasons to indulge our favorite fatalist fantasy, that we are living in painting’s dusk, a last twilit hour."

His paintings deal with art historical questions about viewpoint and representation. They feature symbolically charged subject matter such as hands, apples, shadows, and cameras. His scenes are frequently blocked by a foregrounded object so that realistically rendered imagery is simplified into abstract, geometric compositions. Roberta Smith of The New York Times describes this effect: "The quirky realism, deliberate surfaces and modulated colors ... indicate an attention to ultra-conscious abstract painting."

His stylized figures have been described as reminiscent of Pixar or claymation. The formal arrangements of body parts often create ambiguous interpersonal relationships between the characters in his paintings.

Recently, he has been painting with acrylic on nylon mesh; the unique surface has an odd depth and mimics the halftone of print media.

Some of his new work deals with the unrest in the Middle East and the globalization of media scrutiny.

== Critical reaction ==
Critics praise Worth's humorous yet philosophically sophisticated paintings.

A reviewer in The New Yorker described his paintings thus: “We’re blocked from seeing or interpreting at every turn, but the effect is engaging rather than frustrating."

Jack Bankowsky of Artforum chose Worth for the "Best of 2011," saying, "His subtle play of shadow and substance, of represented image and abstract invention, makes one's head turn circles around how a given picture was made- and what it means to make one."

In The New York Times, Ken Johnson has said: "Painted with sensuous neatness in a nicely simplifying representational style, Alexi Worth's pictures present curious visual puzzles slyly charged with sexual undercurrents. ... It's hard to think of another painter these days who has such infectious fun with the philosophical analysis of modern painting."

In an otherwise positive review of Worth's solo show "Couples," Roberta Smith noted that some of his paintings were "a little too cutely Disney."

He is consistently praised for his technical ability and "academic finesse."

== Teaching ==
Worth has been a senior critic at the University of Pennsylvania Graduate School of Fine Arts since 2001. In 2005 he participated in the Elizabeth Murray critics panel at Museum of Modern Art. He taught at Yale College in Spring 1996 and University of New Hampshire from 1993 to 1995.

== Writing ==
Worth does freelance writing for publications including The New Yorker, Artforum, T magazine, Art in America, ARTnews, and Slate.

Recently he has written catalog texts for artists such as Martha Armstrong, Carroll Dunham, David Humphrey, James Hyde, Susan Jennings, Jackie Saccoccio, George Nick, Jim Nutt, and Philip Pearlstein.

== Awards and honors ==
- 2009 Guggenheim Fellowship in the Arts
- 1999 Tiffany Foundation
- 1994 Regional Fellowship, New England Foundation for the Arts

== Curating ==
- “Self-Made Men,” DC Moore Gallery, New York, NY April 2001
- “The Figure: Another Side of Modernism,” (advisor) Newhouse Center, Staten Island, NY, 2000
- "Social Life,” Clark Gallery, Lincoln MA, October 1995

== Selected exhibitions ==
2013

- "Alexi Worth: States," May 2 – June 15, 2013, DC Moore Gallery, New York, NY "Alexi Worth: States"

2012

- “New Prints/Summer 2012,” Selected by Shahzia Sikander, May 24 – July 27, 2012, International Print Center New York, New York, NY
- “Open Windows: Keltie Ferris, Jackie Saccoccio, Billy Sullivan, and Alexi Worth,” January 14 – April 8, 2012, Addison Gallery of American Art, Phillips Academy, Andover, MA

2011

- “Alexi Worth: Show of Hands,” October 13 – November 12, 2011, DC Moore Gallery, New York, NY "Alexi Worth: Show of Hands"
- "Free Range – Painting and the University of Pennsylvania,” January 24 – February 18, 2011, Morgan Gallery, University of Pennsylvania, PA

2010

- "Between Picture and Viewer" November 23 – December 22, 2010, Visual Arts Gallery, New

York, NY

- “Private Futures,” December 9 – January 29, 2010, Mark Jancou, New York, NY
- “In a Violet Distance,” October 29 – December 4, 2010, Zurcher Studio, New York, NY
- "A Contemporary View of Women Reading," February 10 – April 17, 2010, The Forbes Galleries,

New York, NY 2009

- "Talk Dirty To Me," February 26-March 28, 2009, Larissa Goldston Gallery, New York, NY

2008

- “Eye to Eye,” November 13, 2008 – January 3, 2009, DC Moore Gallery, New York, NY
- “Perverted by Theatre,” curated by Franklin Evans and Paul David Young, October 22 –December 6, ApexArt, New York, NY

2007

- "International Exhibition of Visual Arts," American Academy of Arts and Letters, New York, NY
- "Figure It! The Human Factor In Contemporary Art," April 14-June 24, 2007, The Clay Center, Charleston, WV

2006

- “Couples,” DC Moore Gallery, New York, NY "Alexi Worth: Couples"
- “The Figure in American Painting and Drawing, 1985 – 2005,” Ogunquit Museum of American Art, Ogunquit, ME
- The 181st Annual, National Academy Museum, New York, NY

2004

- “Only Connect,” DC Moore Gallery, New York, NY
- “Conceptual Realism,” Rotunda Gallery, Brooklyn, NY
- “Balancing Act,” Abron's Arts Center, Henry Street Settlement, New York, NY
- “Endless Love,” DC Moore Gallery, New York, NY

2003

- “Inside Scoop,” Geoffrey Young Gallery, Great Barrington, MA
- “Drawing Conclusions,” New York Arts, New York, NY
- “Portraiture Salon Style,” Diamentina Gallery, Williamsburg, Brooklyn, NY

2002

- “Gerberman at Large,” Bill Maynes Gallery, New York, NY
- “Focal Points,” University of Pennsylvania, Philadelphia, PA

2001

- “Double Vision,” Adam Baumgold Gallery, New York, NY
- “Alter Ego,” R. B. Stevenson Gallery, San Diego, CA
- “The Mylar Portraits,” Elizabeth Harris Gallery, New York, NY

2000

- “Nude and Narrative,” P.P.O.W., New York, NY

1997

- “About Drawing,” Hilles Library, Radcliffe College, Cambridge, MA

1996

- Virginia Lynch Gallery, Tiverton RI
- “Locate,” Leubsdorf Gallery, Hunter College, New York, NY

1995

- “Social Life,” Clark Gallery, Lincoln, MA, (curator and participant)

1991

- “New Narratives,” Clark Gallery, Lincoln, MA

1990

- “The Cave,” Mills Gallery, Boston Center for the Arts, Boston, MA
- “Eleventh Annual Boston Drawing Show,” Boston Center for the Arts, Boston, MA

== Selected bibliography ==
2013

- Capshaw, Madeleine, "Frustration Icons," Modern Painters, May 2013.
- Worth, Alexi, "Artschwagerian," Art in America, May 2013.
- "Gorky's Granddaughter" blog, May 5, 2013 Alexi Worth Video

2012

- Broadwayworld.com, “Yaddo to Hold PAPER TRAILS Benefit Auction,” May 2012.
- Walleston, Aimee, "Carroll Dunham Opens Windows for New Talent." Art in America, 12 Mar 2012, illus. .

2011

- Bankowsky, Jack. “Alexi Worth: Show of Hands,” Artforum, December 2011: 209.
- Kunitz, Daniel. "Give Us a Hand," Modern Painters, December 2011/January 2012: 22.

2010

- “Smith, Roberta. It’s Not Dry Yet,” The New York Times. March 28, 2010.

2009

- The New Yorker, January 5
- Johnson, Ken. The New York Times, January 2

2008

- “Art Listings,” Time Out New York, December 18 – 31, 2008, p. 92
- Taylor, Morgan. “Alexi Worth at DC Moore,” artcritical.com, December

2007

- Wilkin, Karen. “At the Galleries,” The Hudson Review, Vol. LIX, No. 4, Winter

2006

- Alpers, Svetlana. "Alexi Worth: Couples," (exhibition announcement) New York: DC Moore Gallery, 2006, illus.
- “Alexi Worth,” The New Yorker, September 11.
- Cohen, David. "Men & Cartoons," The New York Sun, September 7.
- “Visioni multiple,” Kult Magazine
- Johnson, Ken. “For a Broad Landscape An Equally Wide Survey,” The New York Times, May 31
- Smith, Roberta. “Alexi Worth “Couples,” The New York Times, September 15
- The New Yorker, October 2
- Killeen, Michael. “” Worth’s Odd Coupling,” Bloomberg.com, October 6
- Humphrey, David. “at DC Moore,” Art In America, December

2005

- “Galleries-Uptown,” The New Yorker, January 3, p. 14

2004

- Johnson, Ken, “Only Connect,” The New York Times, December 17
- Mullarkey, Maureen, “Alexi Worth: Only Connect,” The New York Sun, December 9

2003

- Frankel, David, Artforum, May
- Viveros-Faune, Christian, “Art,” New York Press, January 8

2002

- Finch, Charlie, “A Sprinkling of Diamonds” Artnet.com, Dec 16
- “Goings On About Town,” The New Yorker, December 16

2001

- Pincus, Robert, “Personal Vision” The San Diego Union Tribune, September 27, p. 41
- “Galleries on Kettner” San Diego Downtown News, September 20
- Reena Janna, “Art Talk” ARTnews, April
- “Posing Pundits” ArtNews, May
- Robinson, Walter, “Weekend Update”Artnet.com, March 13
- “Goings On About Town” The New Yorker, March 5
- Snow, Erica, New York Arts, March
- Valdez, Sarah, “Alexi Worth” Time Out New York, February 22
- “The Amateur” Harper's Magazine, January

2000

- “Nude and Narrative” The New Yorker, October 9

1995

- Unger, Miles, “Social Life” Art New England, September

1990

- Temin, Christine, “Drawing on Diversity…” The Boston Globe, September 14
