= David Erdman =

American architect

David Erdman is an American architect, and chairperson of the Graduate Architecture and Urban Design at Pratt Institute's School of Architecture. He won a 2008 Rome Prize.

== Life ==
He graduated from Ohio State University, and Columbia University.

From 1999 to 2008, he taught at the University of California, Los Angeles Department of Architecture; from 2010 to 2016, he taught at University of Hong Kong. In 2007, he co-founded davidclovers*.

== Works ==
- Contemporary Plasticity.
- Introducing: Short Essays on Influential Thinkers and Designers in Architecture, ORO Editions, 2021
