= Landscape architect =

Architecture occupation

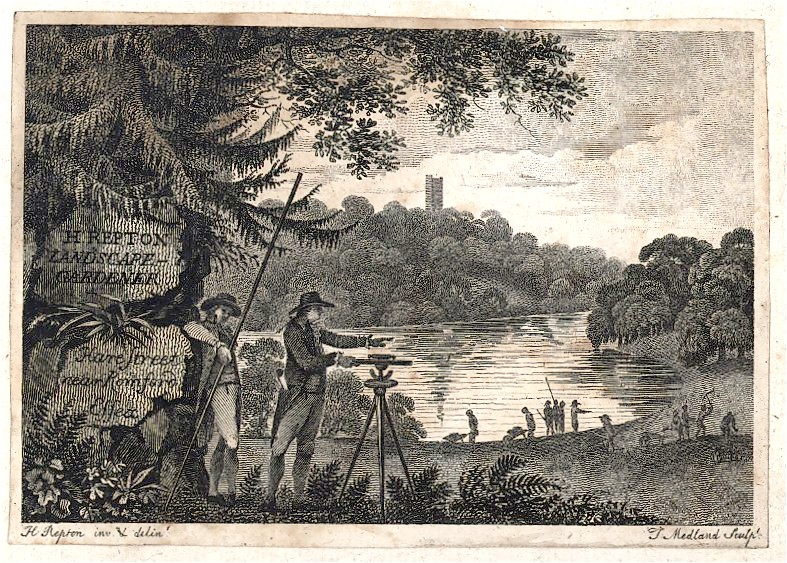
Business card for eighteenth century landscape architect Humphry Repton, by Thomas Medland

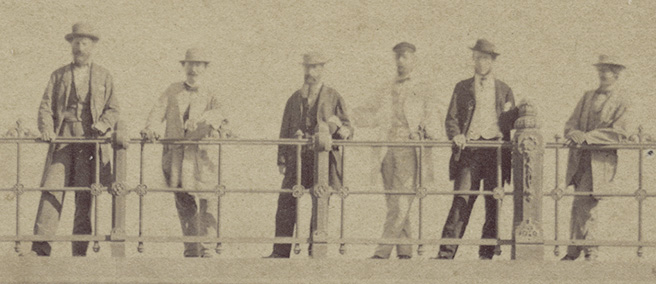
Landscape architects Frederick Law Olmsted and Calvert Vaux and the team they gathered to execute the Greensward Plan, their 1858 design for Central Park in Manhattan, photographed in 1862 at the park standing on the pathway atop the span of the Willowdell Arch (from the left: Andrew Haswell Green, George Waring, Vaux, Ignaz Anton Pilat, Jacob Wrey Mould, and Olmsted)

A landscape architect is a person who is educated and trained in the field of landscape architecture.

According to the International Federation of Landscape Architects, which draws on International Standard Classification of Occupations (ISCO/08, 2162), the profession is defined as:

Landscape Architects plan, design and manage natural and built environments, applying aesthetic and scientific principles to address ecological sustainability, quality and health of landscapes, collective memory, heritage and culture, and territorial justice.

Other definitions emphasise the technical and regulatory aspects of practice. For example, landscape architecture may include site analysis and inventory, land and site planning, planting design, grading and earthworks, nature based solutions, stormwater management, sustainable design, engagement, construction specification, and ensuring compliance with building codes, planning policy, and environmental regulation.

== Origins ==
The origins and practice of landscape architecture dates to some of the earliest of human cultures and just as much as the practice of medicine has been inimical to the species and ubiquitous worldwide for several millennia. The word landscape itself entered English in the late 16th century, derived from the Dutch landschap meaning the area of land that a person can look at all at the same time and the word architect from the Latin architectus, which derives from the Greek (arkhi-, chief + tekton, builder), i.e., chief builder.

However, this article examines the modern profession and educational discipline of those practicing the design of landscape architecture.

In the 1700s, Humphry Repton described his occupation as "landscape gardener" on business cards he had prepared to represent him in work that now would be described as that of a landscape architect.

The term 'landscape architect' was originally coined and promoted by two Scots, Gilbert Laing Meason and John Claudius Loudon, and was subsequently used by William Andrews Nesfield on his plan for a new garden at Buckingham Palace in London. Nesfield and the origins of the landscape architect However, the title was first used in its modern professional sense by Frederick Law Olmsted, the designer of New York City's Central Park in Manhattan and numerous large-scale public and private projects. Olmsted founded a firm of landscape architects that employed highly skilled professionals to design and execute aspects of projects under his auspices.

== Professional requirements ==
Depending on the jurisdiction, landscape architects may be required to obtain professional registration, licensure, or certification to practice. The titles, post-nominal letters, and requirements vary internationally. For example, practitioners may become Chartered Members of the Landscape Institute (CMLI) in the United Kingdom, Registered Landscape Architects (RLA) or Professional Landscape Architects (PLA) in the United States, or hold equivalent status through professional associations and statutory boards in countries such as Australia, New Zealand, and Ireland. In most cases, registration requires completion of an accredited degree, supervised professional experience, and passing an examination, granting the right to practice independently and use the protected professional title.

== Professional organisations ==
=== International Federation of Landscape Architecture (IFLA) ===
The International Federation of Landscape Architects (IFLA) is an organisation which represents the landscape architectural profession globally. It aims to provide leadership and networks to support the development of the profession and its effective participation in the realisation of attractive, equitable and sustainable environments. IFLA currently represents 80 member associations from Africa, the Americas, Asia Pacific, the Middle East and Europe. The Federation's mission is to create globally sustainable and balanced living environments for the benefit of humanity worldwide.

=== Australia ===
The Australian Institute of Landscape Architects (AILA) states that "Landscape Architects research, plan, design, and advise on the stewardship, conservation, and sustainability of development of the environment and spaces, both within and beyond the built environment". This definition of the profession of landscape architect is based on the International Standard Classification of Occupations, International Labour Office, Geneva.

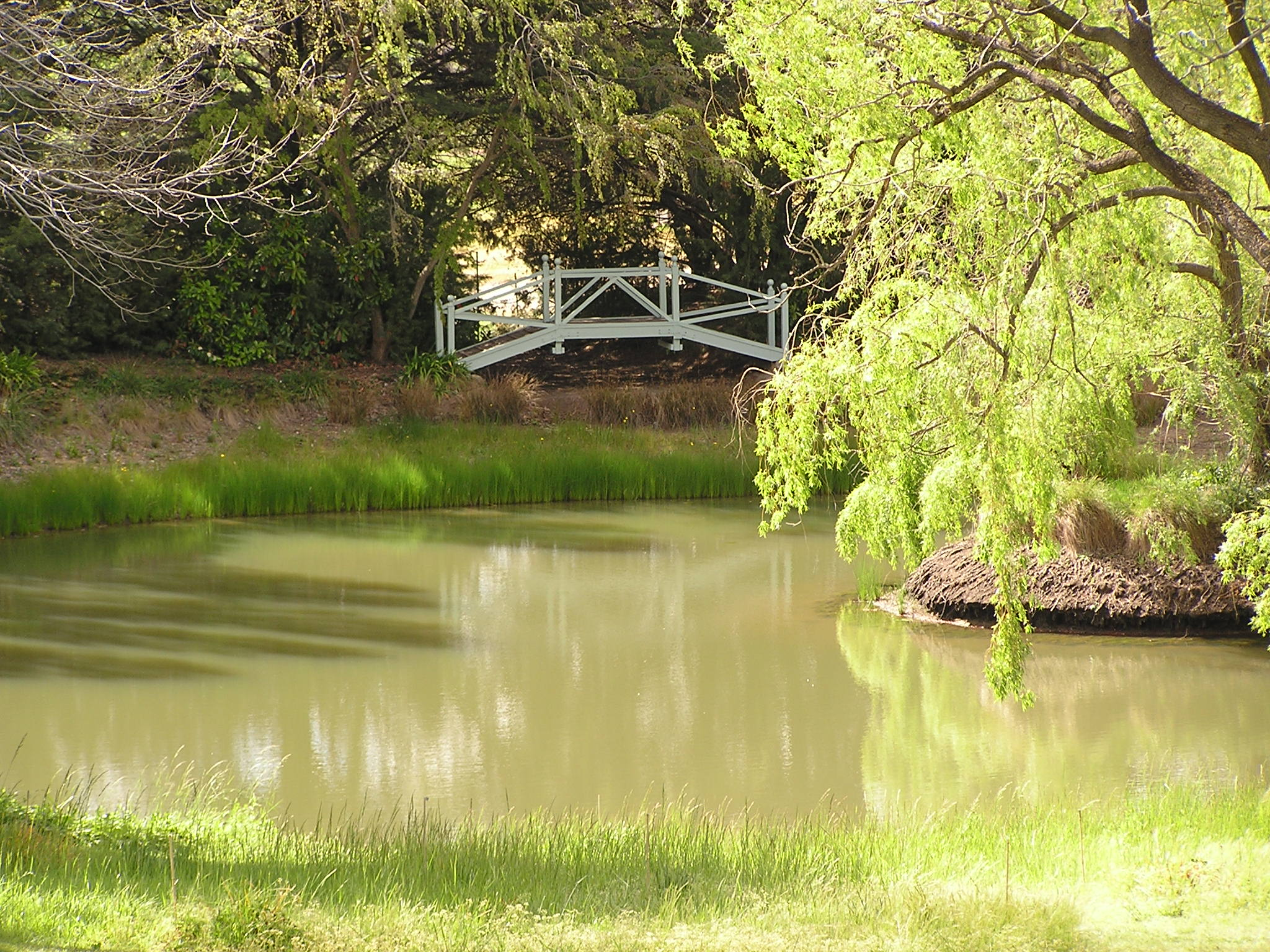
Markdale Garden at Binda near Crookwell, New South Wales, Australia, designed by Edna Walling

Some notable Australian landscape architects include Catherin Bull, Kevin Taylor, Richard Weller, Peter Spooner, Sydney based writer and designer (Doris) Jocelyn Brown, Grace Fraser, Bruce Mackenzie, Mary Jeavons, Janet Conrad, Dr Jim Sinatra, William Guilfoyle, Ina Higgins, Edna Walling, and Ellis Stones.

To become a recognised professional landscape architect in Australia, the first requirement is to obtain a degree in landscape architecture accredited by the Australian Institute of Landscape Architects. After at least two years of recognised professional practice, graduates may submit for further assessment to obtain full professional recognition by AILA.

=== Canada ===
The Canadian Society of Landscape Architects (CSLA) is the country's professional association of landscape architects. Some notable Canadian landscape architects include Cornelia Oberlander, Claude Cormier, Peter Jacobs, Janet Rosenberg, Marc Ryan, and Michael Hough.

=== Ireland ===
The Irish Landscape Institute (ILI), Irish: Institiúid Tírdhreacha na hÉireann, is the professional body for landscape architects and related disciplines in Ireland. Established in 1992. It represents over 300 members across public and private sectors. It is affiliated with international organisations including the European Foundation for Landscape Architecture and the International Federation of Landscape Architects. Notable Landscape Architects are Mary Reynolds (landscape designer) and Robert Carson.

=== New Zealand ===
The New Zealand Institute of Landscape Architects (NZILA), also known by its Māori name Tuia Pito Ora, is the professional body for landscape architects in New Zealand, established in 1972. As of 2021, it has 1,130 members including students. Notable Landscape Architects Jacky Bowring, James Beard (architect), Rachel de Lambert, Di Lucas, Anna Plischke, Diane Menzies, Harry Turbott, Mary Watt, and Megan Wraight.

=== United Kingdom ===
The Landscape Institute, founded in 1929, is the recognised body relating to the field of Landscape Architecture throughout the United Kingdom. To become a recognised landscape architect in the UK takes approximately seven years. To begin the process, one has to study an accredited course by the Landscape Institute to obtain a bachelor's degree in landscape architecture or a similar field. Following this one must progress onto a postgraduate diploma in the field of landscape architecture covering the subject in far greater detail such as mass urban planning, construction, and planting. Following this, the trainee must complete the Pathway to Chartership, a challenging program set out by the Landscape Institute. Following this, one is awarded a full landscape architect title and membership among the Chartered Members of the Landscape Institute (CMLI). Other membership also includes Fellow of the Landscape Institute (FLI) is the highest form of membership awarded to its innovators, leaders and ambassadors. Notable British Landscape Architects include Humphry Reptons, Capability Brown, Geoffrey Jellicoe, Sylvia Crowe, Gertrude Jekyll, Brenda Colvin, Thomas Hayton Mawson, Hal Moggridge, Ian McHarg, Arabella Lennox-Boyd, Tom Stuart-Smith, Johanna Gibbons, Kathryn Moore, Andrew Grant and James Corner.

=== United States ===
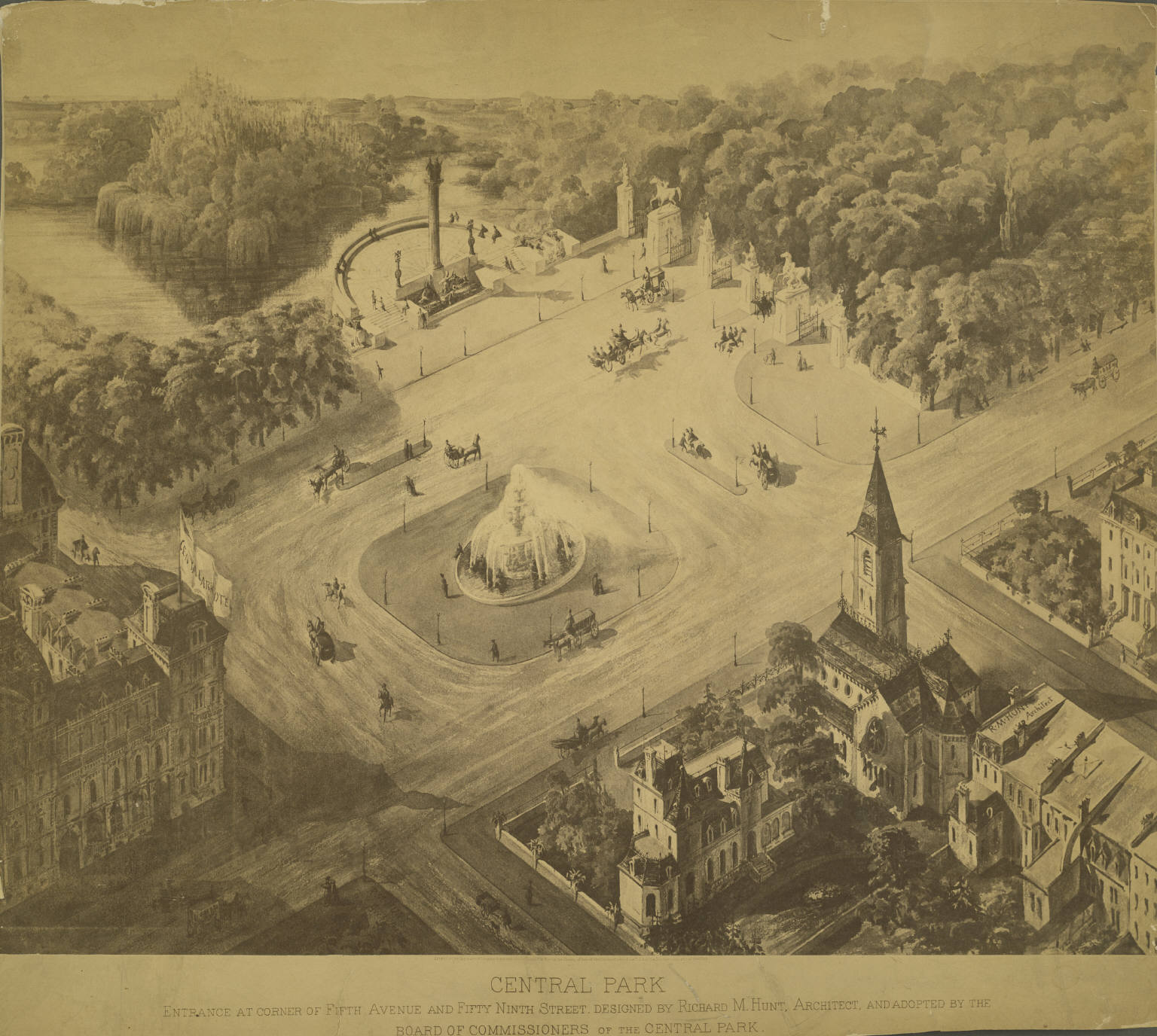
Drawing of plan for an entrance to Central Park in Manhattan by Richard Morris Hunt (American, 1827–1895) c. 1863

The United States is the founding country of the formal profession entitled landscape architecture. Those in this field work both to create an aesthetically pleasing setting and also to protect and preserve the environment in an area. In the U.S., a need to formalize the practice and a name for the profession was resolved in 1899 with the formation of the American Society of Landscape Architects. A few of the many talented and influential landscape architects who have been based in the United States are: Frederick Law Olmsted, Beatrix Farrand, Jens Jensen, Ian McHarg, Thomas Church, Arthur Shurtleff, Ellen Biddle Shipman John Nolen, Lawrence Halprin, Charles Edgar Dickinson, Iris Miller, Robert Royston, Garrett Eckbo, Martha Schwartz and Kate Orff.

Landscape architects who pass state requirements to become registered, licensed, or certified may be entitled to use the postnominal letters corresponding to their seal, typically RLA (Registered Landscape Architect) or more recently, PLA (Professional Landscape Architect) n. In the US, all 50 states have adopted licensure. The American Society of Landscape Architects endorses the postnominal letters PLA, for Professional Landscape Architect, even though there is no legal or professional distinction between the use of RLA or PLA.

Royston summed up one American theme:

Landscape architecture practices the fine art of relating the structure of culture to the nature of landscape, to the end that people can use it, enjoy it, and preserve it.

== Practice ==
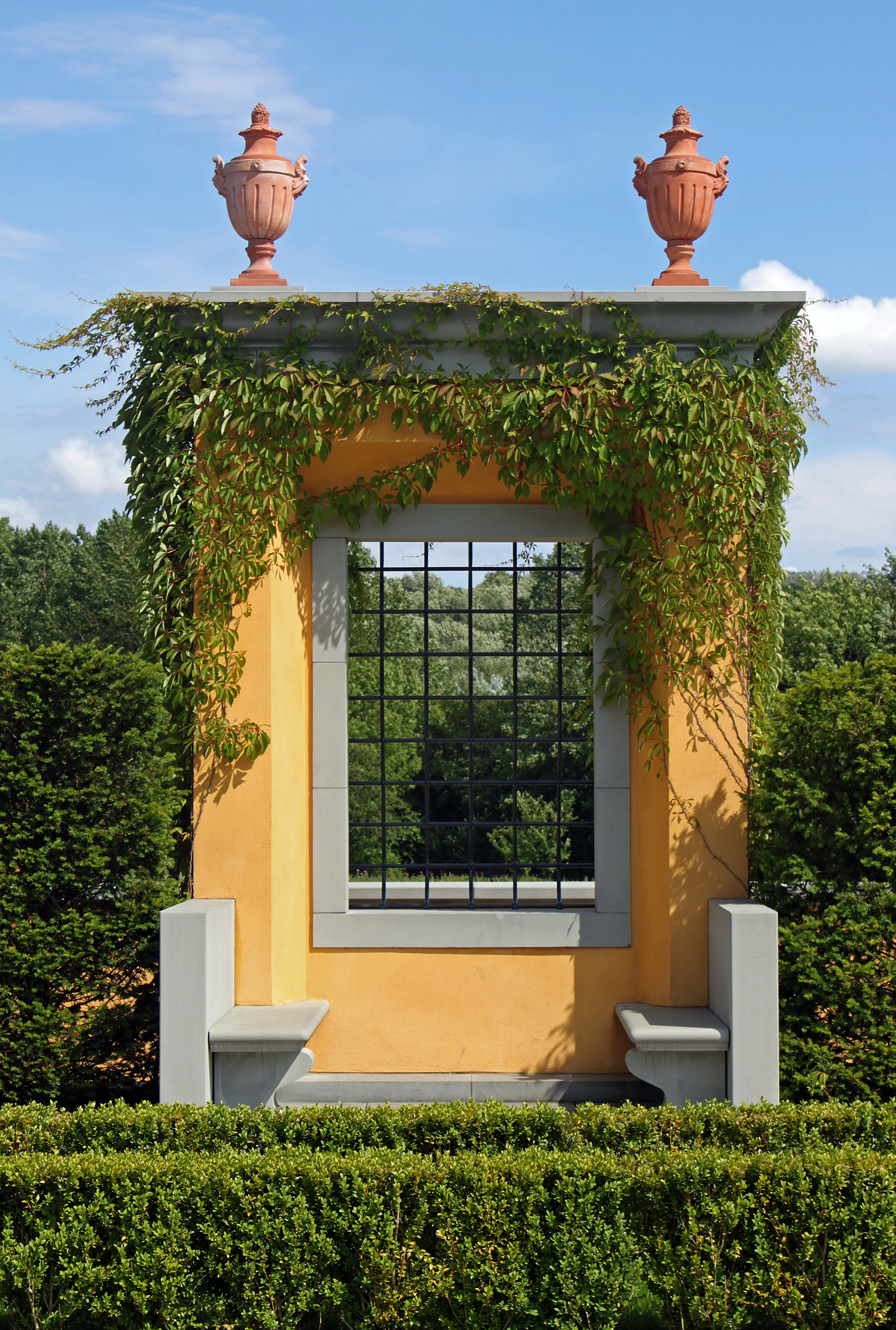
An example of landscape architecture: the Italian Garden, Gardens of the world, Berlin-Marzahn, Germany

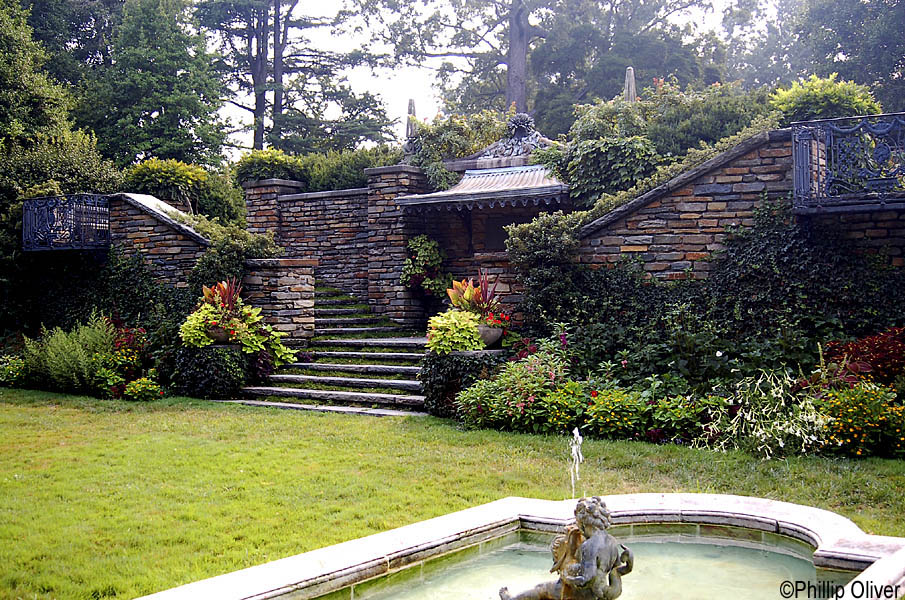
The Fountain Terrace at Dumbarton Oaks in Washington, D.C., designed by landscape architect Beatrix Farrand in 1921, was opened to the public in 1939.

Landscape architects work internationally across scales, from small gardens to regional and global landscapes. Their practice combines design, planning, management, and research, addressing issues such as conservation, heritage, urbanisation, infrastructure, health, and climate resilience.

The profession operates in diverse contexts, from protected area management and heritage restoration to urban regeneration, renewable energy integration, and nature-based solutions in rapidly growing cities.

Scope of practice includes:

- Policy & strategy – Preparing and implementing policies, strategies, and plans for conservation, recreation, climate adaptation, and nature recovery, including national parks and protected areas.
- Conservation and cultural landscapes – Planning and managing national parks, protected landscapes, cultural and historic sites, and recreational areas, often integrating indigenous knowledge and cultural values.
- Urban and rural environments – Designing and maintaining streetscapes, plazas/squares, housing, campuses, parks, gardens, nature reserves, coastal landscapes, agricultural and tourism landscapes.
- Infrastructure and energy projects – Contributing to the planning and design of transport systems, utilities, dams, wind farms, renewable energy, and other major developments and network.
- Assessment and evaluation – Undertaking landscape, environmental, and visual impact assessments to inform policies and projects.
- Site analysis and advice – Analysing climate, soils, water, vegetation, biodiversity, and sustainable drainage systems, and advising clients on design solutions, sequencing, and methods of implementation.
- Health and well-being – Designing landscapes and public spaces that improve quality of life, physical and mental health, promote active lifestyles, support social inclusion, and build climate resilience.
- Design and implementation – Producing plans, specifications, budgets, and schedules, and monitoring construction to ensure compliance with approved designs.
- Research and education – Conducting research, preparing reports, teaching, and advising on topics such as geographic information system (GIS), remote sensing, ecology, law, and cultural interpretation.
- Project and team Leadership – Leading and managing major landscape planning and design projects, coordinating with architects, engineers, planners, and other professionals.
- Legal and advisory Roles – Acting as expert witnesses in planning, development, and environmental courts.

== See also ==
- Landscaping
- Landscape contracting
- Landscape design
- List of landscape architects
- List of professional landscape architecture organisations
- Energy-efficient landscaping
- Ecological engineering
- Urban planner
- Urban planning
