= List of professional landscape architecture organisations =

National landscape architecture organisations have been established to support the profession around the world. The American Society of Landscape Architects was established in 1899, helping to establish the profession in the United States. Many of organisations are members of the International Federation of Landscape Architects (IFLA), including groups established in Africa, Asia, Australia, Europe, North America, and South America.

Professional organisations offer networking opportunities for landscape architects and students, and also provide professional development. These organisations also help develop policies and advance the profession through collective lobbying at the national, state, and local levels. These organisations also encourage their members to acquire certification or licensure, and distribute educational information. Many of these groups also sponsor awards.

The following list of the professional landscape architecture landscape architecture organisations.

== International ==
- Council of Educators in Landscape Architecture (CELA)
- International Federation of Landscape Architects (IFLA)
- Landscape Architect International Alliance

== Africa ==
- Association des Architectes Paysagistes du Maroc (AAPM), Morocco
- International Federation of Landscape Architects Africa (IFLA AFRICA)
- Institute for Landscape Architects in South Africa (ILASA), South Africa
- Landscape Architects Association of Botswana (LAAB) Botswana
- Landscape Architects chapter of the Architectural Association of Kenya (LAAK), Kenya
- Malawi Institute of Landscape Architecture (MILA), Malawi
- Society of Landscape Architects of Nigeria (SLAN), Nigeria
- South African Council for the Landscape Architectural Profession, South Africa
- Tunisian Association of Landscape Architects and Engineers (TALAE), Tunisia

== Americas ==
- IFLA Americas

=== North America ===
- Alberta Association of Landscape Architects (AALA), Canada
- American Society of Landscape Architects, national and local chapters (ASLA), United States
- Asociación Costarricense de Paisajimso (Costa Rica ASOPAICO), Costa Rica
- Asociación de Arquitectura del Paisaje de Guatemala (GUATE-LAND), Guatemala
- Asociación de Arquitectura del Paisaje de América Central y el Caribe, Central Am. + Caribbean (Association of Landscape Architects of Central America and the Caribbean, APAC), Central America and the Caribbean
- Asociación Panameña de Arquitectura del Paisaje (Association of Landscape Architects of Panama, ASAPP), Panama
- Bermuda Association of Landscape Architects (BALA), Bermuda
- Black Landscape Architects Network (BlackLAN)
- Boston Society of Landscape Architects (BSLA)
- British Columbia Society of Landscape Architects (BCSLA), Canada
- Canadian Society of Landscape Architects (CSLA–AAPC), Canada
- Colegio de Arquitectos y Arquitectos Paisajistas de Puetro Rico (CAAPPR), Puerto Rico
- The Cultural Landscape Foundation (CLF), United States
- Landscape Architecture Foundation, United States
- National Association of Minority Landscape Architects, United States
- Manitoba Association of Landscape Architects, Canada
- Ontario Association of Landscape Architects, Canada
- La Sociedad de Arquitectos Paisajistas de México A.C. (Society of Landscape Architects of Mexico, SAPM), Mexico
- Student American Society of Landscape Architects, United States
- Women in Architecture, Landscape Architecture, and Planning, United States

=== South America ===
- Associação Brasileira de Arquitetos Paisagistas (Brazilian Association of Landscape Architects, ABAP), Brazil
- Asociación Paraguaya de Arquitectura del Paisaje (Paraguayan Society of Landscape Architecture, SPAP), Paraguay
- Asociación Peruana de Arquitectura del Paisaje (APP), Peru
- Asociación Uruguaya de Arquitectura del Paisaje (AUDAP), Uruguay
- Centro Argentino de Arquitectos Paisajistas (Argentina Center for Landscape Architecture, CAAP), Argentina
- Instituto Chileno de Arquitectos Paisajistas (Chiliean Institute of Landscape Architects, ICHAP), Chile
- Sociedad de Arquitectos Paisajistas de Ecuador (SAPE), Ecuador
- Sociedad de Arquitectos Paisajistas, Ecología y Medio Ambiete de Bolivia (Bolivia SAPEMA), Bolivia
- Sociedad Colombiana de Arquitectos Paisajistas (Colombian Society of Landscape Architects, SAP), Colombia
- Sociedad Venezolana de Arquitectos Paisajistas (SVAP), Venezuela

== Asia–Pacific ==
- Australian Institute of Landscape Architects (AILA), Australia
- Chinese Society of Landscape Architecture (CHSLA), China
- Chinese Taiwan Landscape Architects Society (CTLAS), Taiwan
- Hong Kong Institute of Landscape Architects (HKILA), Hong Kong
- International Federation of Landscape Architects Asia-Pacific (IFLA APR)
- Ikatan Arsitek Lanskap Indonesia (Indonesian Society of Landscape Architects, ISLA), Indonesia
- Indian Society of Landscape Architects (ISOLA), India
- Institute of Landscape Architects Malaysia (ILAM), Malaysia
- Japan Landscape Architect Union (JLAU), Japan
- Japanese Institute of Landscape Architecture (JILA), Japan
- Korean Institute of Landscape Architecture (KILA), South Korea
- New Zealand Institute of Landscape Architects (NZILA), New Zealand
- Philippines Association of Landscape Architects (PALA), Philippines
- Singapore Institute of Landscape Architects (SILA), Singapore
- Sri Lanka Institute of Landscape Architects (SLILA), Sri Lanka
- Thai Association of Landscape Architects (TALA), Thailand

== Europe ==
- Ассоциация ландшафтных архитекторов России (Association of Landscape Architects of Russia, ALAROS), Russia
- Asociación Española de Paisajistas (AEP), Spain
- Asociația Peisagiștilor din România (Romanian Landscape Architects Association, ASOP), Romania
- Associação Portuguesa dos Arquitectos Paisagistas (APAP), Portugal
- Associazione Italiana Architettura del Paesaggio (AIAPP), Italy
- Association Luxembourgeoise des Architectes Paysagistes (ALAP), Luxembourg
- Association of Landscape Architects of Montenegro, formerly the Association of Landscape Architects of Serbia and Montenegro (UPACG), Montenegro
- Bund Deutscher Landschaftsarchitekten (Association of German Landscape Architects, BDLA), Germany
- Bund Schweizer Landschaftsarchitekten und Landschaftsarchitektinnen / Fédération Suisse des Architectes Paysagistes (BSLA FSAP), Switzerland
- Съюз на Ландшафтните Архитекти в България (Union of Landscape Architects in Bulgaria, ULAB), Bulgaria
- Česká asociace pro krajinářskou architekturu (Czech Association for Landscape Architecture, ČAKA), Czech Republic
- Danske Landskabsarkitekter (Association of Danish Landscape Architects, DL), Denmark
- Društvo krajinskih arhitektov Slovenije (DKAS), Slovenia
- Dutch Union of Landscape Architects (BNT)
- Eesti Maastikuarhitektide Liit (Estonian Association of Landscape Architects, EMAL), Estonia
- European Landscape Architecture Students Association (ELASA)
- Fédération Française du Paysage (FFP), France
- Félag íslenskra landslagsarkitekta (FÍLA), Iceland
- Finlands landskapsarkitektförbund ry (Finnish Association of Landscape Architects, MARK), Finland
- Guild of Landscape Architects of Ukraine (GLAU), Ukraine
- Hrvatsko društvo krajobraznih arhitekata (Croatian Association of Landscape Architects, HDKA), Croatia
- International Federation of Landscape Architects Europe, formally called the European Foundation for Landscape Architecture (IFCAE, formerly EFLA)
- The Irish Landscape Institute (ILI), Ireland
- Landscape Europe
- Landscape Institute (LI), United Kingdom
- Latvijas Ainavu arhitektu asociācija (Latvian Society of Landscape Architecture, LAAA)
- Lietuvos kraštovaizdžio architektų sąjunga (Lithuanian Association of Landscape Architects, LKAS), Lithuania
- Magyar Tájépítészek Szövetsége / Hungarian Association of Landscape Architects (MTSZ / HALA), Hungary
- Nederlandse Vereniging voor Tuin- en Landschapsarchitectuur (Netherlands Association for Landscape Architecture, NVTL), Netherlands
- Norske landskapsarkitekters forening (NLA), Norway
- Österreichische Gesellschaft für Landschaftsplanung und Landschaftsarchitektur (Austrian Society for Landscape Architecture, ÖGLA), Austria
- Panhellenic Association of Landscape Architects (PHALA), Greece
- Slovenská asociácia krajinných architektov (SAKA), Slovakia
- Student Landscape Institute Council (SLIC), United Kingdom
- Stowarzyszenie Architektury Krajobrazu (Association of Landscape Architecture – Poland, SAK), Poland
- Turkish Chamber of Landscape Architects (UCTEA), Turkey
- Udruženje pejzažnih arhitekata Srbije, formerly the Association of Landscape Architects of Yugoslavia and the Association of Landscape Architects of Serbia and Montenegro, (Association of Landscape Architects of Serbia, SALA), Serbia

== Middle East ==
- Egyptian Society of Landscape Architects (ESLA), Egypt
- International Federation of Landscape Architects Middle East
- Iranian Society of Landscape Professions (ISLAP), Iran
- האיגוד אדריכלי הנוףהישראלי (Israeli Association of Landscape Architects, ISALA), Israel
- Jordanian Association of Landscape Architects (JALA), Jordan
- Lebanese Landscape Association (LELA), Lebanon
- Saudi Society of Landscape Architecture (SSLA), Saudi Arabia

== See also ==
- List of schools of landscape architecture
