= New Zealand Institute of Landscape Architects =

Professional association in New Zealand

- Abbreviation: NZILA
- Purpose: "to promote the profession of landscape architecture throughout New Zealand, and to promote the appropriate and sustainable protection, planning, design, intervention and management of our landscapes"
- Location: New Zealand
- President: Henry Crothers
- Website: nzila.org.nz nzila.co.nz

The New Zealand Institute of Landscape Architects Tuia Pito Ora is the professional body for landscape architects in NZ. The institute was founded in 1972, and provides registration to individuals and accreditation to education providers, operates branches around the country, and offers a number of awards, an annual conference and ongoing professional development.

== History ==
A Diploma in Landscape Design was awarded to Edgar Taylor in New Zealand in 1912, by the Canterbury Society for the Arts. However landscape architecture did not become established as a profession until the 1960s. The first undergraduate papers were offered in 1962 at Lincoln College (now Lincoln University) as part of the horticultural science degree. Up until this point training was largely undertaken in America: Harry Turbott, Jim Beard and Frank Boffa all qualified in the US, while Charlie (Sydney) Challenger was trained at Newcastle upon Tyne.

The NZILA was formed in November 1972. The initial executive, elected in 1973, included president Tony Jackman, Frank Boffa, Charlie Challenger, George Malcolm, Neil Aitken, and Robin Gay. Hedley Evans was initially on the executive but was replaced by Earl Bennett. Five of the fifteen practitioners needed for the initial incorporation were women: Eleanor Ironside, Sally Mason, Esmae Sage, Patricia Shiel and Paula Parsonson.

The NZILA's stated objective is "to promote the profession of landscape architecture throughout New Zealand, and to promote the appropriate and sustainable protection, planning, design, intervention and management of our landscapes." The institute's archives are held at Lincoln University. The first doctoral thesis in landscape architecture in New Zealand, by Jacky Bowring in 1997, was on the picturesque in the discourse of the NZILA.

== Activities ==
The institute published its own journal The Landscape from 1976 until 1994 (54 issues), edited by Charlie Challenger. In 1995 the journal became Landscape New Zealand, published by AGM. The institute runs a number of panels and working groups, included a Climate Action Working Group, an RMA Reform Working Group and an Advocacy Panel.

NZILA provides an education policy and an accreditation process to review education programme providers. Lincoln University started an undergraduate course in landscape architecture in 1988, followed in 1995 by Unitec. The third NZILA accredited provider is Victoria University of Wellington. As of 2023, Victoria offers a three-year Bachelor of Architectural Studies in Landscape Architecture and a two Masters of Landscape Architecture, Unitec offers a Bachelor of Landscape Architecture, and Lincoln offers a four-year Bachelor of Landscape Architecture, a two-year graduate entry Bachelor of Landscape Architecture, and a Master of Landscape Architecture.

Within NZ, members of NZILA when they achieve their professional standing, can use the title Registered Landscape Architect NZILA. Registration requires an accredited qualification and three to four years experience in the profession.

=== Regional branches ===
In the mid-1980s, under the presidency of Diane Menzies, the NZILA introduced a branch structure. The NZILA has seven regional branches: Auckland, Central North Island, Canterbury and Westland, Hawkes Bay and Manawatū, Wellington, Nelson and Marlborough, and Southern.

== Awards ==
The institute holds biennial awards. There are three Supreme Awards, selected from the winners of the general awards: the George Malcolm Award for "the most outstanding achievement in landscape design", the Charlie Challenger Award for "the most outstanding achievement in landscape planning", and the Te Karanga o te Tui, for "the most outstanding achievement in demonstration of the Te Aranga principles". There are fourteen categories of general award:

1. Parks, open space and recreation
2. Education and play
3. Civic and urban design
4. Residential and gardens
5. Institutional and commercial
6. Transport
7. Resource management and strategic planning
8. Master planning and urban design strategy
9. Landscape planning and assessment
10. Landscape management
11. He iti pounamu
12. Research and communication
13. Student
14. Enduring landscape

=== Honorary fellows ===
The institute has appointed a number of members as honorary fellows. The requirements are "a person distinguished by scientific, artistic, literary or other eminent attainment whose activities promote or have promoted the aims and objectives of the Institute."

As of 2023, the honorary fellows are Jock Phillips, Glenn Thomas and Margaret Trotter. In memoriam honorary fellows are James Beard, John Hayward, Percy (Bing) Lucas, Lance McCaskill, George McMillan, Lawrie Metcalf, Kevin O’Connor, Geoff Park, Ted Smyth, Gordon Stephenson and John Wendelken.

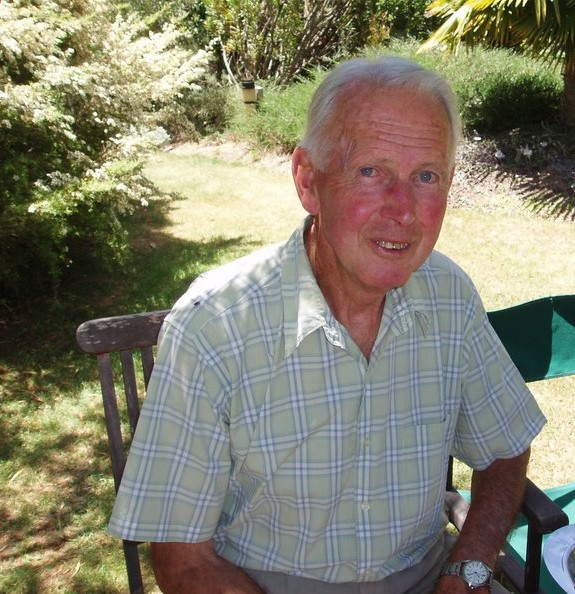
Lawrie Metcalf

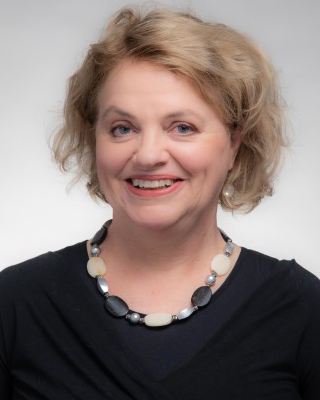
Jacky Bowring

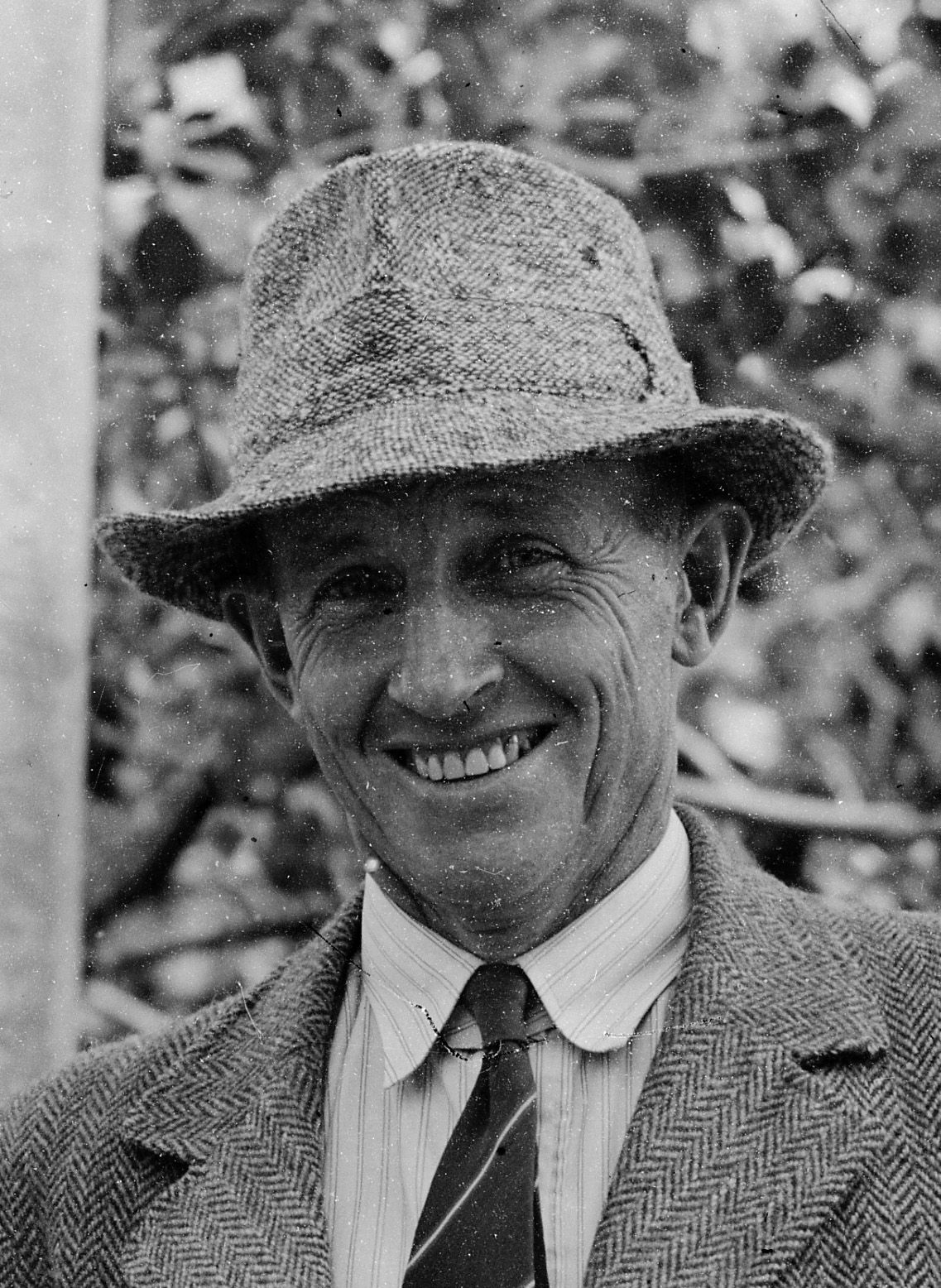
Lance McCaskill

=== Life members ===
Life membership may be awarded to "a person who in the opinion of the Committee has made a unique and outstanding contribution to the advancement of the profession in New Zealand, provided that a person should not be elected to this grade of membership unless he/she is, or has been, qualified to be recognised as a Fellow of the Institute."

As of 2023 the institute had ten life members, and listed three more "in memoriam" (Charlie Challenger, Robin Gay and George Malcolm). Life members include:

Name	Year awarded	Image
Frank Boffa	1998	
Neil Aitken	2004	
Diane Menzies	2005	
Earl Bennett	2012	
Alan Titchener	2017	
Ross Jackson	2019	
Di Lucas	2020	
Simon Swaffield	2021	
Dennis Scott	2022	
Jan Woodhouse	2022	

=== Other awards ===
The institute's president presents awards to individuals, groups or organisations who "advance the profession of Landscape Architecture through their time, dedication, passion and vision". A $1500 scholarship is offered every year to study at an approved landscape architecture course.

== Conference ==
The NZILA holds an annual conference. The 2022 conference was held in Auckland and focused on the 50th anniversary of the organisation. The NZILA is a member of the Asia–Pacific regional chapter of the International Federation of Landscape Architects (IFLA), and in April 2013, NZILA, jointly with the Australian Institute of Landscape Architects, hosted the 50th IFLA World Congress in Auckland, New Zealand.
