= IFLA =

IFLA may refer to:

- International Federation of Library Associations and Institutions
- International Federation of Landscape Architects
