= Robert Holden (landscape architect) =

British landscape architect

Robert Holden is a British landscape architect born in Preston and educated at the University of Newcastle upon Tyne. Later a director of Brian Clouston and Partners, and director of the MA Landscape Architecture programme at the University of Greenwich. From 2004 he served as Secretary General of the European Foundation for Landscape Architecture. Robert Holden has been described as the leading European landscape architecture critic of his generation.

== Books ==
Robert Holden is the author of

- International Landscape Design, Laurence King, London, 1996
- New Landscape Design, Architectural Press, London, 2003
- Construction for Landscape Architecture, with Jamie Liversedge, Laurence King Publishing (2011) ISBN 978-1856697088
- with Jamie Liversedge Techniques et détails de construction en architecture paysagère, (2011) ISBN 978-2100594177 Dunod
- La Construccion en el Proyecto del Paisaje, with Jamie Liversedge (2011) 978-8425223907 Gustavo Gil
- 景观建筑工程 with Jamie Liversedge(2013) ISBN 7121204428 电子工业出版社
- Fieldwork, with Lisa Diedrich and Eric Luiten (eds) (2006) ISBN 978-3764375089 Birkhaüser
- Fieldwork : L'architecture du paysage en Europe, with Lisa Diedrich and Eric Luiten (eds) (2006) ISBN 978-2884745567 Infolio
- Fieldwork. Landschaftsarchitektur Europa, with Lisa Diedrich and Eric Luiten (eds) (2006) ISBN 978-3764375072 Birkhaüser
- Fieldwork Landschapsarchitectuur in Europa, with Lisa Diedrich and Eric Luiten (eds) (2006) ISBN 978-90-6868-423-0 TOTH
- New Landscape Design,: (2003) ISBN 978-1-85669-290-8 Laurence King
- Nueva Arquitectura del Paisaje, (2004) 978-9688874028 Gustavo Gil
- 新景观设计(精), ( 2004) ISBN 9787541619830 云南科技出版社
- International Landscape Design, (1996) ISBN 978-1856690850 Calmann King
- Urban Parks, with John Merivale and Tom Turner (1992) The Landscape Institute
