= Kathryn Moore (landscape architect) =

Kathryn Moore, FLI PPLI, is a British landscape architect, educator, and researcher. She is Professor of Landscape Architecture at Birmingham City University.

Moore trained as a landscape architect in the United Kingdom and holds a professorship at Birmingham City University. She leads the West Midlands National Park Lab, a visionary initiative to reconceptualise the West Midlands as an urban-inclusive "national park"—not via formal designation, but by promoting green infrastructure, equitable access to nature, and transformative regional perception. This was applauded in the 2020 UK Government Review of Landscapes.

Moore served as President of the International Federation of Landscape Architects (IFLA) and is a past president of the Landscape Institute, enhancing international collaboration, advancing the role of the profession in climate response, and promoting design-led sustainable development. She has held visiting academic chairs, including the Arnold Weddle Visiting Chair at the University of Sheffield and the Thomas Jefferson Visiting Chair at the University of Virginia. She serves on the Independent Design Review Panel for HS2. She also advises Natural England via its Landscape Advisory Panel.

Moore is actively engaged in global discourse on urban landscapes. In November 2024, she facilitated the World Urban Forum 12 session titled “Towards an International Landscape Convention – Rethinking Land Use,” bringing together policymakers, UN representatives, and built environment professionals.

== Awards and honours ==
She was recognised in 2019 by the Landscape Institute (UK) as one of its most inspiring women since the institute’s foundation.

== Publications ==
- Overlooking the Visual: Demystifying the Art of Design (2010), a theoretical work exploring perception, the role of design, and promoting an inclusive, confident pedagogical approach to design.
