= International Scientific Committee on Cultural Landscapes =

Scientific committee of the International Council on Monuments and Sites

- Formation: 1971; 55 years ago (as International Scientific Committee on Historic Gardens and Sites, changed 1999 to present name)
- Type: Scientific Committee of ICOMOS (International Council on Monuments and Sites)
- Members: 93 members (29 voting members from 28 member states, 64 contributing expert members) as of 2016
- Official languages: English, French and Spanish
- Committee President: Elizabeth Brabec, USA (2023- ); Past Presidents: Patricia O'Donnell, USA (2017-2023); Steve Brown, Australia (2014–2017); Monica Luengo Spain (2009-2014)
- Website: landscapes.icomos.org

The International Scientific Committee on Cultural Landscapes (ISCCL) is a committee of scientific experts on cultural landscapes that works, as a part of the International Council on Monuments and Sites (ICOMOS), to develop international guidance on cultural landscape documentation and management, and to prepare expert recommendations for prospective World Heritage nominations. The committee functions as a joint effort with members from both ICOMOS and the International Federation of Landscape Architects (IFLA).

== Background ==
UNESCO has defined cultural landscapes as "the combined works of nature and man [sic]". The ISCCL, composed of scientific experts from around the world, functions to advise "ICOMOS on matters relating to the identification, documentation, assessment, conservation and presentation of cultural landscapes, including those that are nominated or designated as World Heritage sites". The committee develops statements and principles as guidance for both World Heritage and as technology transfer for cultural landscape management worldwide. The committee functions and work are governed by the Eger-Xi'an Principles for The International [Scientific] Committees of ICOMOS, as adopted in July 2008.

The focus of UNESCO World Heritage designation has turned more recently to the importance of cultural landscapes as the bridge between the designation and protection of both natural heritage and cultural heritage sites. Although Natural Heritage sites are evaluated by IUCN (International Union for Conservation of Nature), more recently there has been a co-operative effort between ICOMOS and IUCN to designate and manage sites in tandem.

== History ==
The parent organization of the ISCCL, the International Council on Monuments and Sites (ICOMOS) was established in 1965. However, it was not until 1971 that the ISCCL was first established with an initial focus on gardens. The broadening of focus to cultural landscapes in 1999 reflected a changing understanding of the role of landscapes in culture and heritage, and as the link between humans and nature. The Committee is well known for its work to produce the ICOMOS Florence Charter on Historic Gardens (1982), which at the time was innovative for the recognition of dynamic plant assemblages in historic gardens as a form of 'monument'.

== Annual meetings and symposia ==
- 1971 Fontainebleau, France: Restoration of historic gardens
- 1972 Paris, France
- 1973 Grenada, Spain: Islamic Gardens
- 1974 Brussels, Belgium
- 1975 Zeist, Netherlands: Ornamental Plants in 16th and 17th century gardens
- 1976 Brussels, Belgium
- 1977 Prague/Kromeriz, Czechoslovakia (now Czech Republic)
- 1978 Paris, France
- 1979 Bruges/Brussels, Belgium
- 1980 Barcelona, Spain
- 1981 Florence, Italy
- 1982 Brussels, Belgium
- 1983 München, Germany
- 1984 Brussels, Belgium
- 1985 Versailles, France
- 1986 Copenhagen, Denmark
- 1987 Oxford, England
- 1988 La Napoule/Menton, France
- 1989 Potsdam, Germany
- 1990 Lausanne, Switzerland; Leiden, Netherlands
- 1991 Pisa, Italy
- 1992 Aranjuez, Spain
- 1993 Montréal, Canada
- 1994 Fulda, Germany
- 1995 Pultusk, Poland
- 1996 Berlin/Dessau/Wortliz, Germany; Sofia, Bulgaria
- 1997 Prague/Lednice-Valtice/Cesky Krumlov, Czech Republic: Landscape heritage
- 1998 Aranjuez
- 1999 Berlin, Germany; Guadalajara, Mexico
- 2000 Naples, Italy
- 2001 Buenos Aires, Argentina: Historic Gardens – multidisciplinary approach
- 2002 Madrid, Spain
- 2002 Ferrara, Italy UNESCO World Heritage Center
- 2003 Bad-Muskau, Germany
- 2004 Brussels, Belgium
- 2005 Xi'an, China
- 2006 Coimbra, Portugal
- 2007 San José, Costa Rica
- 2008 Québec, Canada
- 2009 Tokyo, Japan
- 2010 Istanbul, Turkey
- 2011 Fontainebleau/Paris, France: 1971-201130 year retrospective
- 2012 Hangzhou, China
- 2013 Canberra, Australia
- 2014 Florence, Italy
- 2015 Jeju, South Korea
- 2016 Bath, England
- 2017 New Delhi, India – Committee meeting and lead on the Culture Nature Journey
- 2018 Mendoza, Argentina – Symposium on urban, periurban and rural cultural landscapes: Benefits, Problems, Opportunities, December 10–13.
- 2019 Dublin, Ireland
- 2019 Marrakesh, Morocco – Rural Heritage: Landscapes and Beyond, symposium organizers, International Scientific Committee Symposium at the ICOMOS General Assembly, October 17.

== Initiatives ==
World Rural Landscapes

To develop an international working group to "foster the worldwide cooperation in the understanding, management and protection of rural landscapes".

ICOMOS passed a doctrinal Principles text "Concerning Rural Landscape as Heritage" at the 19th ICOMOS General Assembly in Delhi India on 15 December 2017.

Nature Culture Journey

September 2016: The development of the "Mālama Honua, a statement of Commitments from the Nature-Culture Journey at the IUCN World Conservation Congress, Hawaii December 2017: Culture Nature Journey at the ICOMOS General Assembly, New Delhi
