= Edgar Taylor =

Edgar Taylor may refer to:

- Edgar Taylor (author) (1793–1839), British writer of legal, historical, and literary works
- Edgar Taylor (aviator) (1897–1918), American flying ace of World War I
- Edgar Taylor (horticulturist) (1886–1979), New Zealand landscape architect
- Edgar Kendall Taylor (1905–1999), British pianist
