= Landscape Institute =

UK-based professional body

- Abbreviation: LI
- Formation: 1929; 97 years ago
- Type: Professional body
- Purpose: Promoting the activities and profession of landscape architecture in the United Kingdom and elsewhere
- Headquarters: London, W1T; United Kingdom
- Location: United Kingdom
- Region served: UK
- Members: c. 6,000 landscape architects
- President: Carolin Göhler
- Main organ: LI Board of Trustees
- Website: Landscape Institute LI

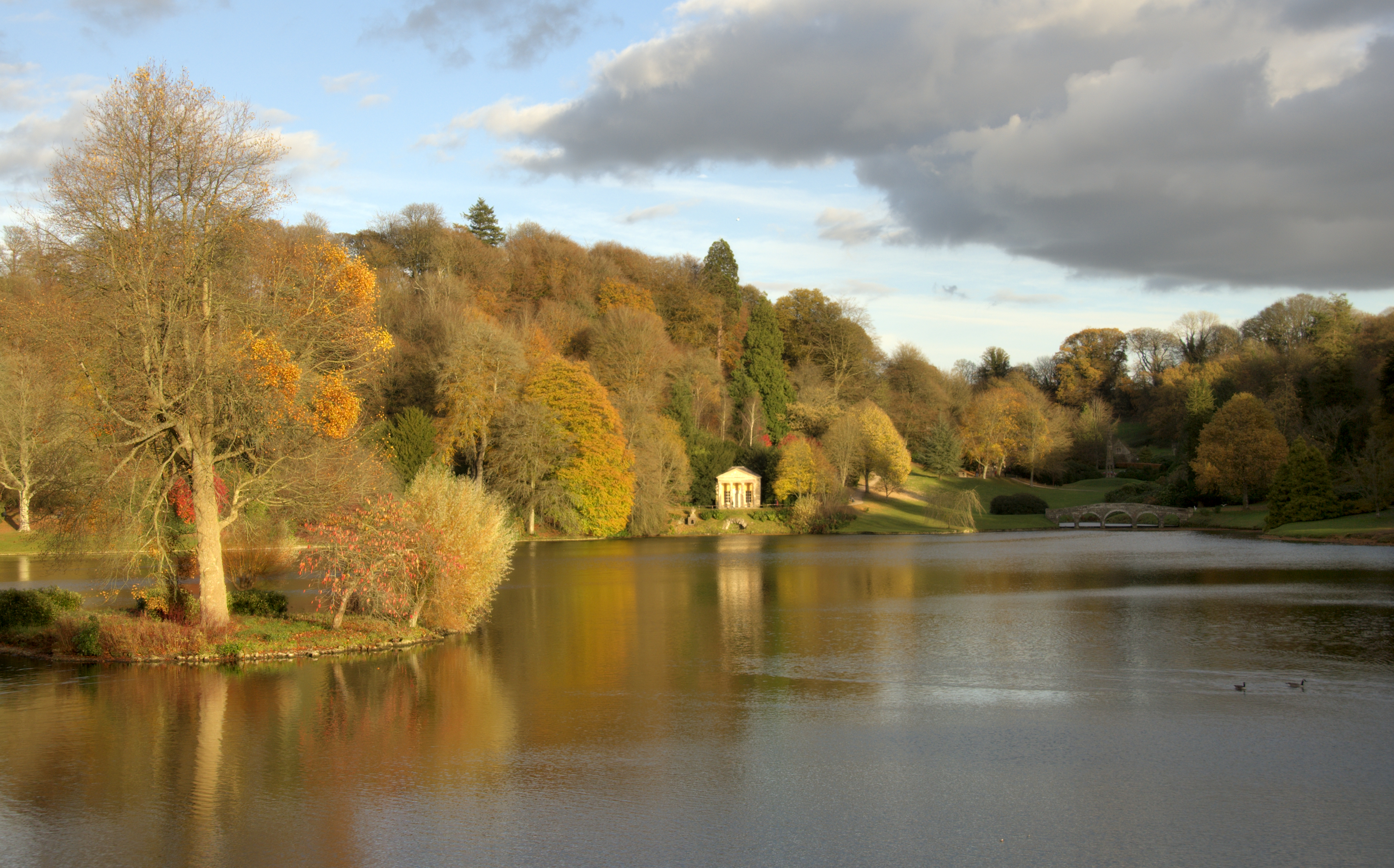
The landscape profession was inspired by the classical world. Stourhead

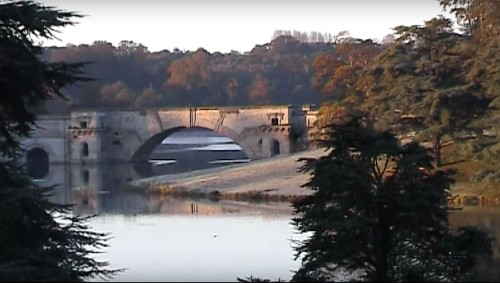
The landscape park at Blenheim Palace was designed by Capability Brown. Though often described as 'Britain's most famous landscape architect' Brown was born two centuries before the formation of what is now the UK Landscape Institute and one century before the invention of the term 'landscape architecture'

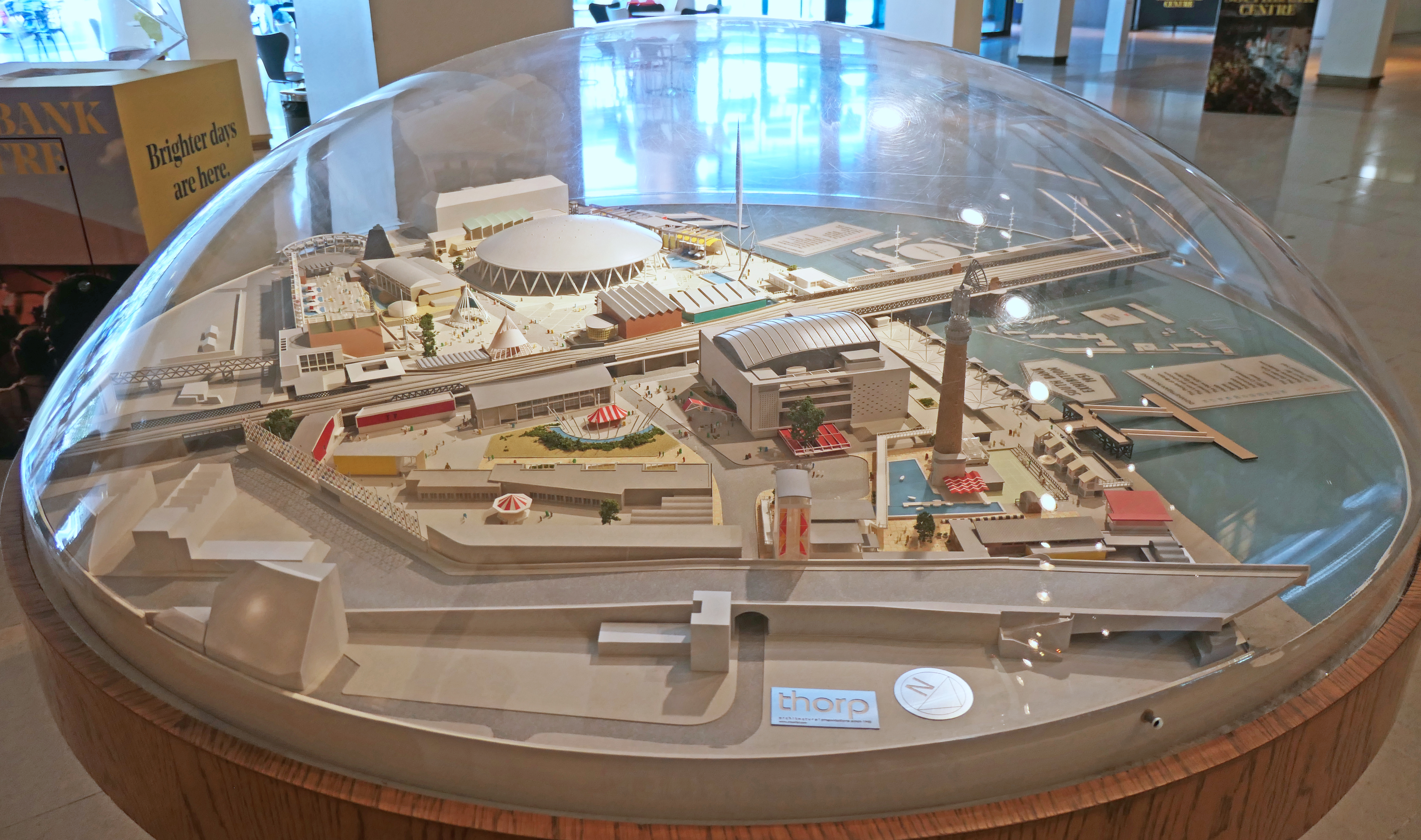
The 1951 Festival of Britain was one of first prestige public projects on which British landscape architects were engaged

The Landscape Institute (LI) is a UK based professional body for the landscape profession. Its membership includes landscape architects, urban designers, landscape planners, landscape scientists and landscape managers. The LI also has a category for academic members.

Founded in 1929–1930 as the Institute of Landscape Architects (ILA), it was granted a royal charter in 1997. In the words of its longest serving president, Geoffrey Jellicoe, “It is only in the present century that the collective landscape has emerged as a social necessity. We are promoting a landscape art on a scale never conceived of in history.”

The LI seeks to promote landscape architecture and to regulate the landscape profession with a code of conduct that members must abide by. The LI had ‘over 900’ members at its fortieth birthday (in 1969) and by 1978 had over 1,500 members. In 2019 the total membership of the LI was 5,613. In 2025 this increased to over 6,000. The Landscape Institute royal charter was granted in 1997 and revised in 2008 and 2016. Its objects and purposes are specified as follows (in Clause 5. (1): ‘The objects and purposes for which the Institute is hereby constituted are to protect, conserve and enhance the natural and built environment for the benefit of the public by promoting the arts and sciences of Landscape Architecture (as such expression is hereinafter defined) and its several applications and for that purpose to foster and encourage the dissemination of knowledge relating to Landscape Architecture and the promotion of research and education therein, and in particular to establish, uphold and advance the standards of education, qualification, competence and conduct of those who practice Landscape Architecture as a profession, and to determine standards and criteria for education, training and experience.’

The Landscape Institute publishes the journal Landscape (formerly Landscape Design), and is a member of the International Federation of Landscape Architects.

== Development of the landscape profession in the UK ==
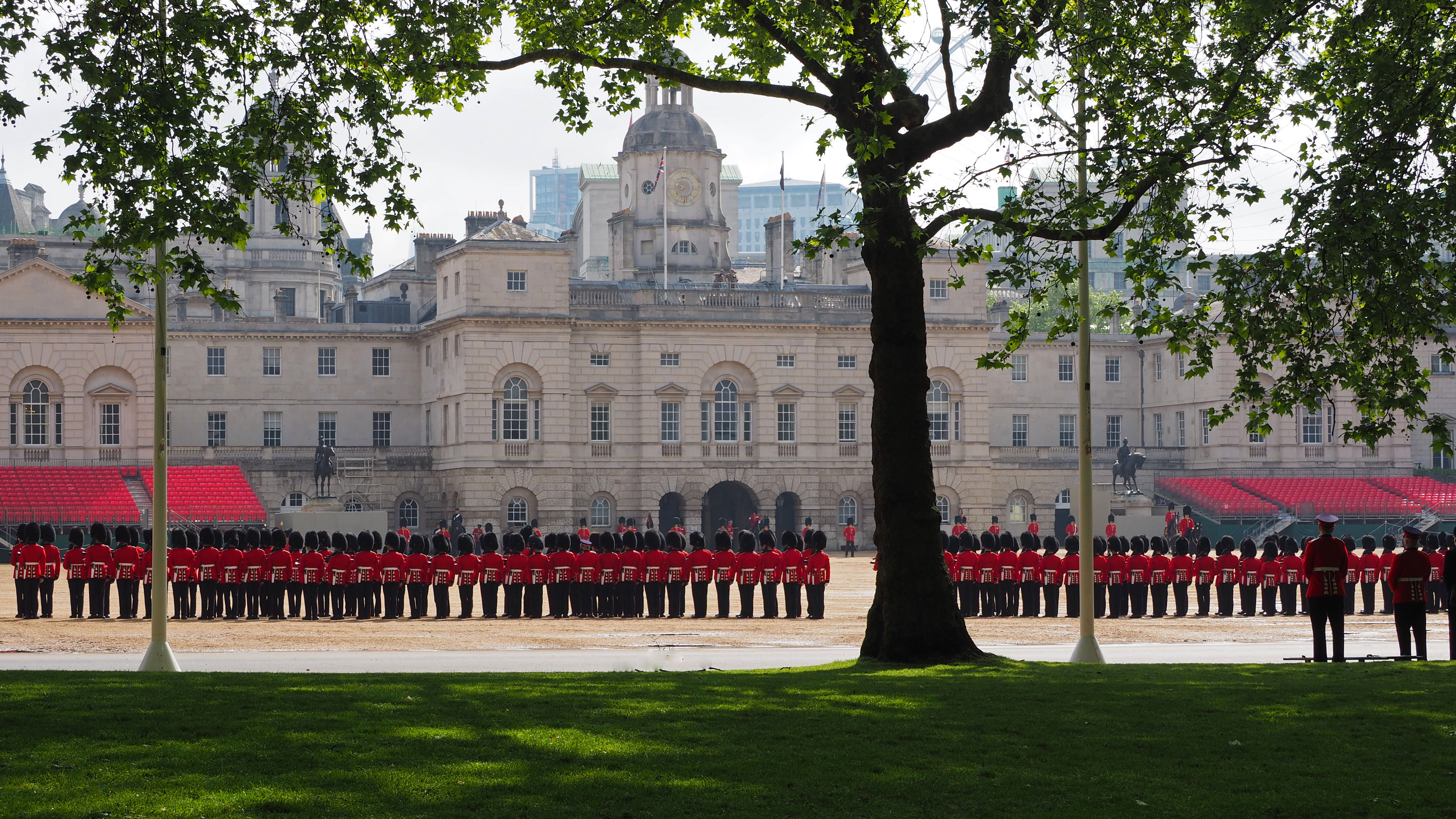
After many years as a car park (for civil servants) Horse Guards Parade was restored by landscape architect Hal Moggridge as a parade ground and civic square

The growth of landscape architecture has been led by its membership and supported by its secretariat and by government legislation since the 1940s, The relevant legislation included the New Towns Act (1946) which led to a requirement for special attention to the ‘landscape treatment’ of New Towns, and thus to the first salaried jobs for landscape architects in the public service. The European Environmental Impact Assessment Directive EIA Directive (85/337/EEC) (1985) led new jobs in preparing environmental impact assessments.

From the 1950s to the 1980s, the public sector (particularly local authorities) was the largest employer of landscape architects, with a minority working in private practice. In the 21st century, and especially following public spending reforms post-2009, a greater majority of landscape architects are employed in the private sector.

=== History of the term ‘landscape architecture’ ===
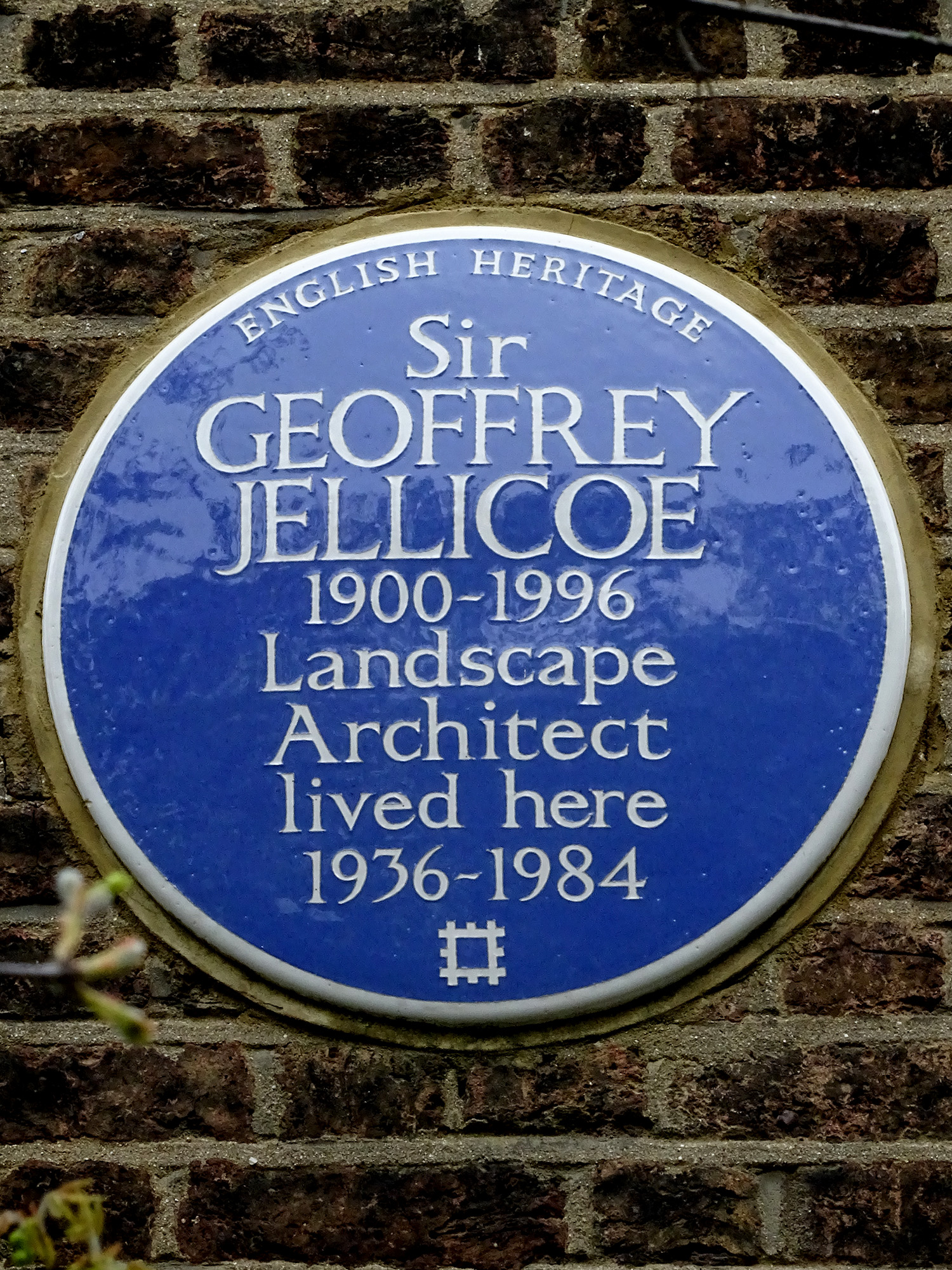
Geoffrey Jellicoe lived in Grove Terrace, Highgate, London

‘Landscape architecture’ is a modern name for an ancient art. The development of the ancient art is analysed by Geoffrey Jellicoe, in The Landscape of Man, and by Norman T. Newton in Design on the land. Jellicoe describes the cave paintings of Lascaux c30,000 BC as the ‘First Landscapes consciously conceived by man’. Newton, defines ‘landscape architecture’ as the art ‘of arranging land, together with the spaces and objects upon it, for safe, efficient, healthful, pleasant human use’ and writes that ‘the ancient art became a new profession officially, when in 1863 the title Landscape Architect was first used by the state-appointed Board of Central Park Commissioners in New York City. It had been employed unofficially by Frederick Law Olmsted and Calvert Vaux beginning in 1858’.

Though its use as a professional title is American, the origin of the term ‘landscape architect’ is European. Charles Waldheim identifies two possible nineteenth century origins: in France and in the UK. The possible French origin comes from Jean-Marie Morel. He was an ‘architect, engineer, and garden designer’ and he ‘is credited with the formulation ‘’architecte-paysagiste’’’. This possibility was identified in the late nineteenth century and researched by Disponzio.

The possible UK origin was identified in 1982 and researched by Nina Antonetti in 2012. She traces the term ‘landscape architecture’ to Meason and its use as professional title to William Andrews Nesfield. Meason's book was published in 1828 and deals with the relationship between buildings and their settings. John Claudius Loudon welcomed the new term 'landscape architect' and used it in the Gardeners Magazine, which he edited, and in two of the encyclopedias he published: the Encyclopedia of Gardening (from the 1835 edition onwards) and the Encyclopedia of Cottage, Farm, Villa Architecture (1838). Loudon also used it in the title of his 1840 book: The landscape gardening and landscape architecture of the late Humphry Repton, esq. The publicity given to the term ‘landscape architecture’ by Loudon led to the term ‘landscape architect’ used by some British garden designers from the mid-nineteenth century onwards. The most notable example is its use in 1849 by William Andrews Nesfield. Nesfield described himself as a landscape architect on his submitted plan for the garden of Britain's most famous residence, Buckingham Palace.

UK use of the term ‘landscape architect’ (‘garden designer’) tailed off towards the end of the nineteenth century. It was Olmsted's long and brilliant career that led to it becoming famous and being associated with public projects: for parks, greenways, open space systems and urban design. His most famous projects were Central Park in New York and the Emerald Necklace of green space in Boston. This was the sense in which ‘landscape architecture’ returned to the UK and was adopted by the Landscape Institute, as described below.

=== History of the ILA and LI ===
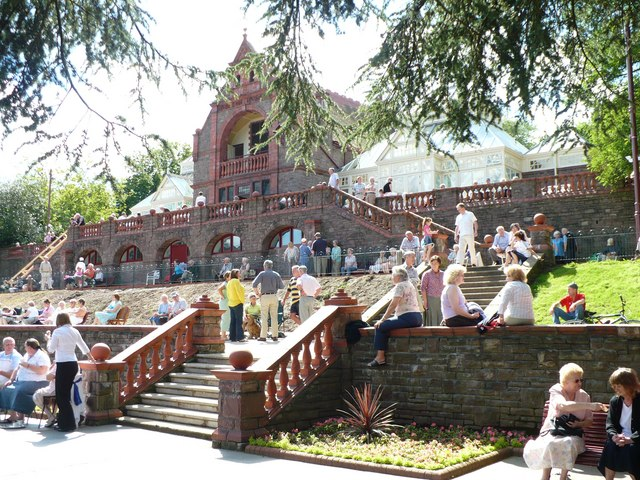
The professional career of Thomas Mawson, who became the first President of the Institute of Landscape Architects, began with garden design, moved to public parks and extended to civic design

Discussion of the need for landscape architecture to have a professional body in the UK began with a 1911 article on ‘’The Position and Prospects for Landscape Architecture in England’’. It was written by Thomas Mawson and argued for the creation of a Society of Landscape Architects. When working on the Dunfermline Competition for Pittencrieff Park, Thomas Mawson and Patrick Geddes had been the first two men to use the term ‘landscape architect’ in the sense established by Frederick Law Olmsted's office. Mawson's article contributed to the formation of a new body but there was a disagreement about what name it should have. It came to be called the Town Planning Institute (TPI) and is now the Royal Town Planning Institute (RTPI). Mawson became its president in 1923.

Stanley V Hart was concerned at the lack of unity in the British section of the International Exhibition of Garden Design (held in October 1928) and used an advertisement in The Gardeners' Chronicle to invite interested parties to attend a meeting at the Chelsea Flower Show in 1929. According to Brenda Colvin (who was present) the original intention was to call it the ‘British Association of Garden Architects’. She told Tony Aldous, who was commissioned by the LI to write a book on its history, that ‘Most of the people who started the institute were only doing private gardens, you must remember’. So ‘If we had called it Landscape Gardeners, it would have taken us much longer to arrive at the full scope the profession has today – if we had arrived at all’. She also told Aldous that ‘Thomas Adams persuaded the founding members to follow the American lead and for ‘Landscape Architects’ The decision to change its name to the Institute of Landscape Architects (ILA) was taken in 1930 and the new institute was launched. The Objects of the ILA were defined in Clause 2 of its first Constitution (drafted by Gilbert Henry Jenkins): ‘The Institute shall be formed to promote the study and general advancement of the Art of Landscape Architecture in all its branches, and to serve as a medium of friendly intercourse between the members and others practising or interested in the Art’. In Clause 3, ten Methods of Achievement were set out: Establish suitable headquarters; Arrange lectures; Prepare sets of lantern slides; Promote the publication of a Journal; Arrange periodical exhibitions; Found a Library; Educate the public in the Art of Landscape Architecture; Secure the establishment of one or more Training Centres; Organise visits to good examples of Landscape Architecture; Hold Conferences with other Societies who can assist in promoting the Art of Landscape Architecture. The journal of the new institute had the title Landscape and garden and was edited by a well-known garden designer and author: Richard Sudell.

The early membership of the ILA was mostly garden designers and architects. Some of the garden designers (including Stanley Hart) left because of the restriction that members of the new institute must not earn money from trade. Inspired by the practice of the Royal Institute of British Architects members had to declare that ‘I am not engaged in the sale of anything connected with gardening, nor am I financially interested in any commercial gardening undertaking’ The focus of the ILA began to expand beyond gardening when Thomas Adams became its president in 1937. He had been the first president of the Town Planning Institute (in 1914) and had extensive experience of planning and landscape architecture in the US and Canada. The broadening of the workload accelerated when Geoffrey Jellicoe became president of the ILA in 1939. He visited the US in 1942 and, like Adams, was impressed by the range of work undertaken by members of the American Society of Landscape Architects (ASLA). Richard Sudell supported the broadening of the workload. In 1948 Jellicoe became the founding president of the International Federation of Landscape Architects (IFLA). To my mind, the expansion to include public projects was obviously right – but turning away from garden design was obviously wrong. It was like excluding poetry from a course on English literature.

But the expansion was a success and the fruits of the ILA's promotion of landscape architecture are detailed in the chapters of Tony Aldous’ Chapter 3: public clients; Chapter 4 new towns; Chapter 5 university campuses; Chapter 6; Whitehall; Chapter 7: roads; Chapter 8: power, steel, rail, canals and airports; Chapter 9: forestry and reservoirs; Chapter 10: local authorities; Chapter 11: mineral extraction; Chapter 12: corporate clients.

In 1977, the Institute of Landscape Architects changed its name to the Landscape Institute and expanded its membership to include landscape managers and landscape scientists, as well as the landscape architects who remain the largest specialism. The collective name for the various specialists is ‘landscape professionals’.

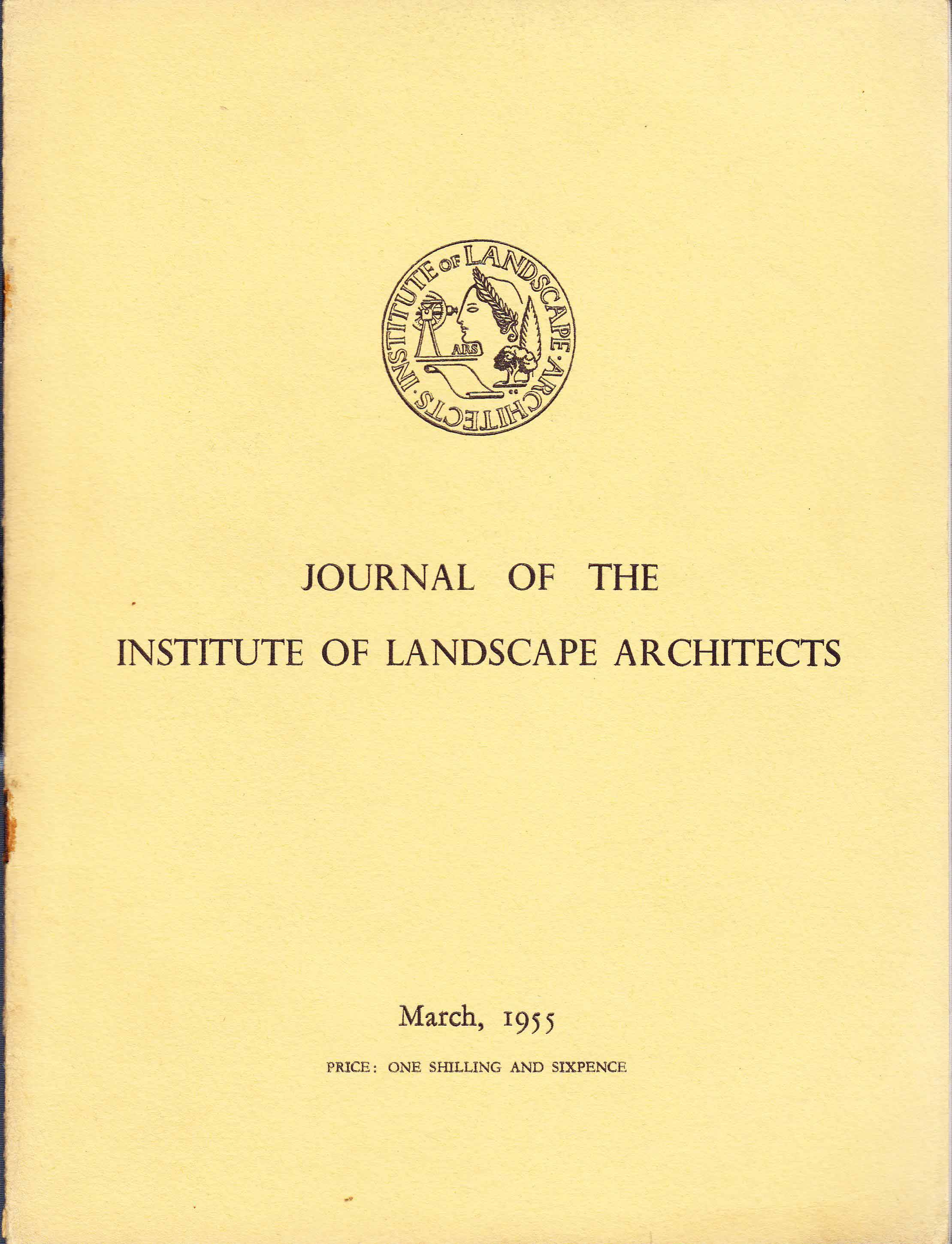
Cover of the Journal of the Institute of Landscape Architects (JILA) for March 1955. The ILA logo was designed by Colin Gill (a cousin of Eric Gill)

== Membership ==
LI members include landscape architects, landscape managers, landscape planners, landscape scientists and urban designers.

The Affiliate membership category is an open category with minimal requirements. To become a professional member, however, candidates must first have completed an LI-accredited university course or alternatively be assessed as a special case for admission as an Associate. Following this they proceed along the Pathway to Chartership (P2C), a mentored and supervised programme of learning which culminates in an interview with two examiners who are senior members of the profession, once the candidate has attained an agreed level of competency. This process was formerly known as 'Part IV' of the Landscape Institute's own design examination. Parts I to III were replaced by the system of accredited degree courses in the mid-1980s.

‘Landscape Architect’ is not a protected title in the UK (unlike the title ‘architect’ there is no state register). However, it is a regulated profession and the UK Government recognises the Landscape Institute as the regulating body . It would therefore be fraudulent to use the title 'Chartered Member of the Landscape Institute' and the designation 'CMLI' if one was not a chartered member.

Fellowship (FLI) is the highest grade of membership in the Landscape Institute, awarded to professionals who have shown outstanding leadership, innovation, and influence in shaping landscapes and the profession. Fellows form part of the College of Fellows, a group that champions excellence and helps guide the future direction of the Institute. Entry is through application and peer review, open to Chartered members and recognised experts. Successful applicants may use the post-nominal FLI, marking their role as ambassadors for the profession and their contribution to advancing landscape practice and policy.

In 2022, saw the launch of the Technician Member of the Landscape Institute (TMLI). A tailored professional qualification for those with a focus on technical or specialist work. There are two routes to becoming a Technician; Experienced route to Technician (E2T) or Apprenticeship route to Technician (A2T).

== Activities ==
The activities of the LI include maintaining a membership database, member communications, newsletters, the Journal, CPD, professional examinations, enforcing a Code of Practice, policy and technical outputs, and advocacy. The LI's publications include: Guidance for Landscape and Visual Impact Assessment 3rd Ed. (jointly with IEMA), Visualisation of Development, and BIM for Landscape. In 2008, the LI, supported by CABE, launched a campaign to increase the number of Landscape Architects in the UK. Entitled I want to be a Landscape Architect, it focused on increasing the number of postgraduate and undergraduate students taking LI accredited courses.

In July 2018, the I want to be a Landscape Architect initiative was replaced by a new careers campaign entitled #ChooseLandscape, which aimed to raise awareness of landscape as a profession; improve and increase access to landscape education; and inspire young people to choose landscape as a career. This campaign included other landscape-related professions such as landscape management, landscape planning, landscape science and urban design.

The LI was one of the steering group partners of Neighbourhoods Green, a partnership initiative which worked with social landlords and housing associations to highlight the importance of, and raise the overall quality of design and management for, open and green space in social housing. It is also represented on the Board of The Parks Alliance and Building with Nature and has Memoranda of Understanding with the Institute of Place Management (IPM) and Landscapes for Life (the National Association for Areas of Outstanding Natural Beauty NAAOB).

== Library and archive ==
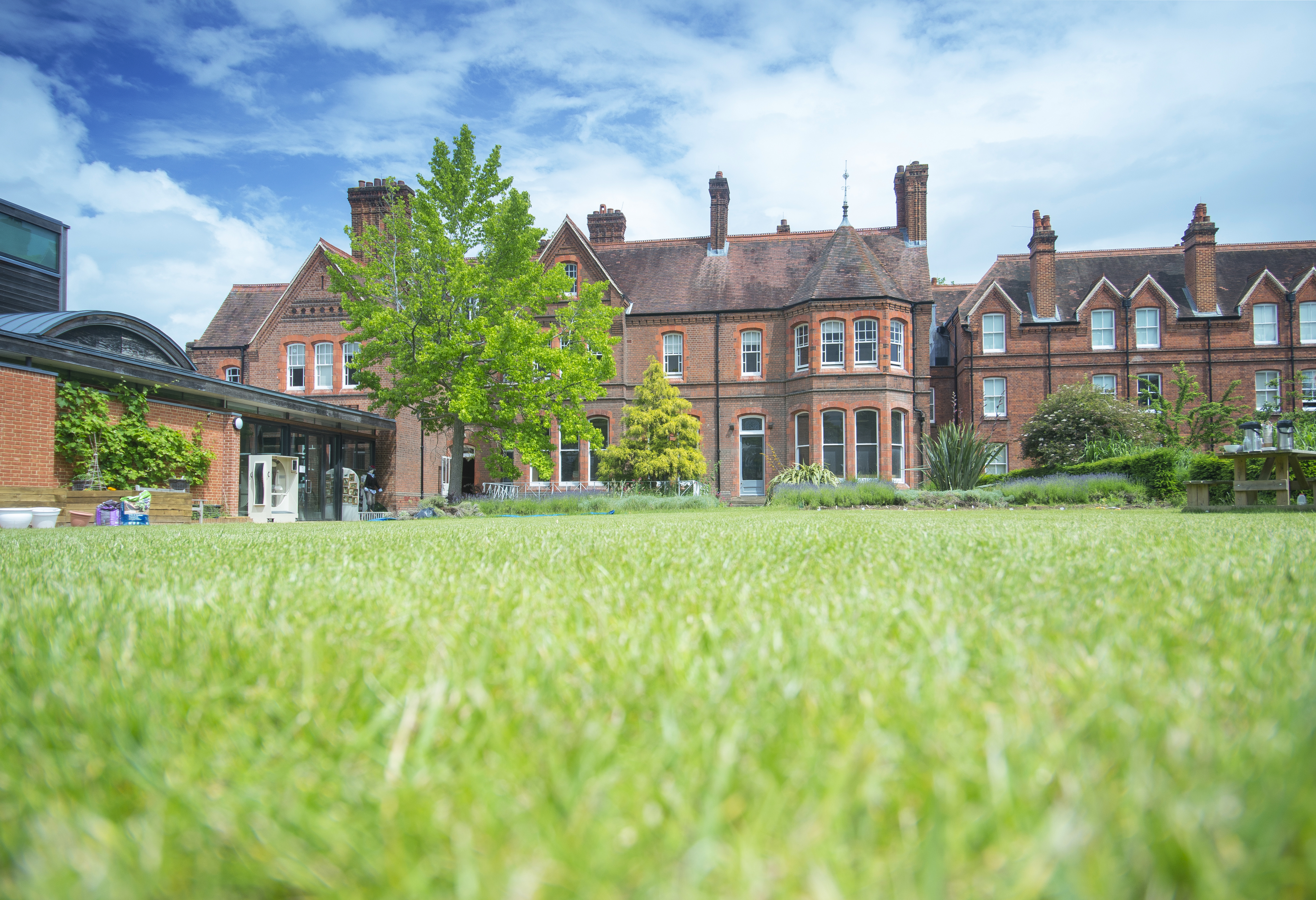
The Landscape Institute's Library and Archive is housed at the Museum of English Rural Life in Reading

The Institute of Landscape Architects (the Landscape Institute's previous name), built up a collection of library books and archives relating to the practice of design and management with the purpose of creating a national landscape collection. The library was formally established in 1967. The archive collections began in the 1990s as landscape architects died and their collections were bequeathed, donated, or actively collected by the institute. In 2013, the Landscape Institute Archive and Library was gifted to the Museum of English Rural Life (MERL) at the University of Reading and is available to Institute members, researchers and members of the public. It receives financial support from the Landscape Institute.

== Governance ==
When founded in 1929, the Institute of Landscape Architects comprised a council and members. As the organization grew, its governance arrangements evolved alongside changes to its physical headquarters.

=== Governance Challenges 2022 ===
In July 2021, Brodie McAllister was elected President-elect but was prevented from taking office in July 2022 following a confidential whistleblowing disclosure regarding an incident during an internal meeting. The incident received national coverage in The Times, which reported McAllister's claim of an "Orwellian" vendetta following his promise to modernise the Institute.

HortWeek reported that a group of past presidents (including Hal Moggridge, Merrick Denton-Thompson, Brian Clouston, Tim Gale, and Alan Tate) signed a letter of support for McAllister, calling the decision to remove him "without precedent." Critics described the complaint as "superficial" and disputed the use of a whistleblowing framework for the matter. Pro Landscaper further noted the complaint was made after two previous inquiries had found no case to answer.

The Institute's 2022 Annual Report recorded legal fees of £78,034 related to the case, with a further £91,664 in the following year due to "aggravated activity" by members. A requisition for an EGM by 145 members was declared "invalid" by the Board, and Acting President Noel Farrer stated the whistleblowing case was closed and would not be reopened.

== Presidents ==
The Institute is required by its Royal Charter to elect a President for a two-year term.

- 2024–2026: Carolin Göhler
- 2022–2024: Vacant (Note: Brodie McAllister was elected President-elect in 2021 to serve the 2022–2024 term. Following his removal as a Trustee in June 2022, the position remained officially vacant. Presidential duties were fulfilled by the Vice-President and the Immediate Past President until the 2024 election.)
- 2020–2022: Jane Findlay
- 2018–2020: Adam White
- 2016–2018: Merrick Denton-Thompson
- 2014–2016: Noel Farrer
- 2012–2014: Sue Illman
- 2010–2012: Jo Watkins
- 2008–2010: Neil Williamson
- 2006–2008: Nigel Thorne
- 2004–2006: Kathryn Moore (landscape architect)
- 2002–2004: Rod Edwards
- 2000–2002: David Jarvis
- 1999–2000: Tim Gale
- 1997–1999: Richard Burden
- 1995–1997: Alan Tate
- 1993–1995: Michael Ellison
- 1991–1993: Hugh Clamp
- 1989–1991: Andrew Bannister
- 1987–1989: Cedric Lisney
- 1985–1987: John Whalley
- 1983–1985: David Randall
- 1981–1983: Brian Clouston
- 1979–1981: Hal Moggridge
- 1977–1979: Arnold Weddle
- 1975–1977: William Gillespie
- 1973–1975: Cliff Tandy
- 1971–1973: Derek Lovejoy
- 1969–1971: Bodfan Gruffydd
- 1967–1969: Brian Hackett
- 1965–1967: Peter Shepheard
- 1963–1965: Leslie Milner-White
- 1961–1963: Peter Youngman
- 1959–1961: Frank Clark
- 1957–1959: Sylvia Crowe
- 1955–1957: Richard Sudell
- 1953–1955: James Adams
- 1951–1953: Brenda Colvin
- 1949–1951: Thomas Sharp
- 1939–1949: Geoffrey Jellicoe
- 1937–1939: Thomas Adams
- 1935–1937: Gilbert Jenkins
- 1933–1935: Edward Prentice Mawson
- 1931–1933: Edward White
- 1930–1931: Thomas Mawson}}

== See also ==
- Landscape architecture
- Landscape Architect
- History of landscape architecture
- Landscape urbanism
- Landscape planning
- Schools of landscape architecture
- Construction Industry Council
- Environmental impact assessment
- English landscape garden
- Garden design
- History of gardening
- Geoffrey Jellicoe
