= List of schools of landscape architecture =

This is a list of schools of landscape architecture. Universities and other institutions in many parts of the world offer qualifications in landscape architecture.

== Americas ==
=== Argentina ===
- UBA (Universidad de Buenos Aires) (bachelor's program)
- Universidad Católica de Córdoba (master's program only)

=== Brazil ===
- Universidade Federal do Rio de Janeiro

=== Canada ===
- University of British Columbia (master's program and bachelor's in landscape architecture & urbanism)
- University of Guelph
- University of Manitoba (master's program and bachelor's in environmental design, landscape + urbanism stream)
- Université de Montréal
- University of Toronto (master's program only)
- University of Calgary (Master of Landscape Architecture)
- Dalhousie University (bachelor's program)

=== Chile ===
- Universidad Central de Chile (bachelor's program)
- Pontificia Universidad Católica de Chile (master's program only)

=== Colombia ===
- Universidad Pontificia Bolivariana (master's program only)

=== Mexico ===
- UNAM (Universidad Nacional Autonoma de Mexico)

=== United States ===
- Academy of Art University (not LAAB approved)
- Auburn University (BLA + MLA)
- Arizona State University (bachelor's and a new master's program)
- University of Arizona (master's program only)
- University of Arkansas (bachelor's program only)
- Ball State University (bachelor's and master's program)
- Boston Architectural College (BLA + MLA)
- Brigham Young University Idaho (bachelors only)
- California Polytechnic State University, San Luis Obispo (bachelor's program only)
- California Polytechnic State University, Pomona
- University of California, Berkeley
- University of California, Davis (bachelor's program only)
- Chatham University (master's program only) (no new candidates, program closed)
- University of Cincinnati (master's program only)
- City College of New York (master's program only)
- Clemson University
- Colorado State University (bachelor's program, master's program introduced 2010)
- University of Colorado Denver (master's program only)
- University of Connecticut (bachelor's program only)
- Cornell University (College of Agriculture and Life Sciences) (B.S. & M.L.A.)
- University of Delaware (College of Agriculture and Natural Resources) (B.S.)
- University of Florida (bachelor's and master's program)
- Florida International University (FIU School of Architecture)
- University of Georgia (College of Environment & Design)
- Harvard University (master's program only)
- University of Idaho (B.S. & M.L.A.)
- University of Illinois at Urbana–Champaign
- Illinois Institute of Technology
- Iowa State University
- Kansas State University
- University of Kentucky (bachelor's program only)
- Louisiana State University
- University of Maryland, College Park (bachelor's and master's programs)
- University of Massachusetts Amherst
- Michigan State University (bachelor's program only)
- University of Michigan (master's program only)
- University of Minnesota (master's program only)
- Mississippi State University
- Morgan State University (master's program only)
- University of Nebraska–Lincoln
- University of Nevada, Las Vegas (bachelor's program only)
- University of New Mexico (master's program only)
- North Carolina A&T State University (bachelor's program only)
- North Carolina State University
- North Dakota State University (bachelor's program only)
- Northeastern University
- Ohio State University
- Oklahoma State University (bachelor's program only)
- University of Oklahoma (master's program only)
- University of Oregon (B.L.A, M.L.A., PhD)
- University of Pennsylvania (master's program only)
- Pennsylvania State University (undergraduate and graduate programs: BLA, MLA, MSLA, PhD)
- Philadelphia University (undergraduate: BLA)
- Purdue University (bachelor's program only)
- University of Rhode Island (bachelor's program only)
- Rhode Island School of Design
- Rutgers University (bachelor's program and recent master's program)
- University of Southern California (MLA)
- State University of New York - Environmental Science and Forestry (SUNY-ESF) (BLA, MLA, MS & BLA/MS Fast Track)
- Temple University (Master of Landscape Architecture and Bachelor of Science Landscape Architecture)
- Texas A&M University
- Texas Tech University
- Thomas Jefferson University
- University of Tennessee at Knoxville (master's program only)
- University of Texas at Arlington (master's program only)
- University of Texas at Austin (master's program only)
- Utah State University (BLA, B+MLA accelerated degree, MLA, PhD)
- Virginia Polytechnic Institute and State University
- University of Virginia (master's program only)
- Washington State University (accredited BLA and MSLA programs)
- Washington University in St. Louis (master's program only)
- University of Washington
- West Virginia University (accredited BLA and MSLA programs)
- University of Wisconsin–Madison (accredited BSLA and MSLA programs)

=== Uruguay ===
- Universidad de la República - facultad de arquitectura y agronomia.

== Europe ==
=== Austria ===
- University of Natural Resources and Life Sciences, Vienna - Landscape Architecture and Landscape Planning (bachelor and master)

=== Belgium ===
- Gembloux Agro-Bio Tech, University of Liège, ULB Faculty Architecture LaCambre Horta (bachelor and master), Gembloux
- Hogeschool Gent - School of Arts (vakgroep Architectonisch Ontwerp) (bachelor), Ghent
- Erasmushogeschool Brussel (bachelor), Anderlecht
- Haute Ecole Lucia de Brouckère (bachelor), Anderlecht

=== Bulgaria ===
- University of Forestry – Sofia (Master's program only)

=== France ===
- Agrocampus Ouest, Angers, Landscape engineer
- ENSP Versailles, Lille, Bordeaux, Marseille, Landscape architect
- ENSPNP Blois, Landscape architect
- ESAJ, Paris, Landscape architect
- Garden Design Academy, France (distance learning courses)

=== Germany ===
- Beuth University of Applied Sciences Berlin
- Technische Universität Berlin
- Technische Universität Dresden
- Anhalt University of Applied Sciences
- Leibniz University Hannover
- Technical University of Munich
- Weihenstephan-Triesdorf University of Applied Science
- Fachhochschule Erfurt
- Nürtingen-Geislingen University of Applied Science
- Hochschule Neubrandenburg
- Hochschule Geisenheim
- University of Kassel

=== Hungary ===
- Szent István University – Faculty of Landscape Architecture (BA/BSc, MA/MSc, MLA - 4 semester - English - Master programme)

=== Italy ===
- University of Pisa (master's degree in Design and Planning of green areas and the landscape)
- University of Turin
- University of Genoa
- University of Bologna
- University of Rome La Sapienza
- University of Reggio Calabria (BA, PhD)
- University of Florence (Master, PhD)
- University of Perugia
- University of Palermo
- University of Naples Federico II (Master's program Faculty of Architecture, BSc Faculty of Agriculture)
- University of Padua (bachelor's program only, Faculty of Agriculture)
- Politecnico di Milano (Master's degree in Landscape Architecture - Land Landscape Heritage)

=== Ireland ===
- University College Dublin

=== Netherlands ===
- Technische Universiteit Delft (TU Delft) Delft, The Netherlands
- Wageningen University, Wageningen, the Netherlands
- Academy of Architecture, Amsterdam, the Netherlands

=== Norway ===
- Norwegian University of Life Sciences (NMBU) (5-year Master's program in Landscape Architecture)
- The Oslo School of Architecture and Design (AHO) (5-year Master's program in Landscape architecture and 2-year Master's program in Landscape Architecture in Oslo and Tromsø)

=== Portugal ===
- Instituto Superior de Agronomia, Lisbon
- Universidade do Porto, Porto
- Universidade de Évora, Évora
- Universidade do Algarve, Faro
- Universidade de Trás-os-Montes e Alto Douro, Vila Real

=== Romania ===
- University of Agronomic Sciences and Veterinary Medicine - Faculty of Horticulture, Bucharest (4-year bachelor's degree in Landscape Architecture)
- University of Architecture and Urban Planning "Ion Mincu" - Faculty of Landscape Architecture, Bucharest
- University of Life Sciences "King Mihai I" from Timisoara - Faculty of Engineering and Applied Technologies ( Bachelor in Landscape Architecture)

=== Spain ===
- Escola Superior d'Agricultura de Barcelona. ESAB. Bachelor's Degree in Landscape Architecture.
- Universidad Rey Juan Carlos. Bachelor's Degree in Landscape Architecture.
- Universidad Camilo José Cela, Madrid (Bachelor's Degree)
- Cátedra de Paisajismo Castillo de Batres (Master's Degree and Doctoral Degree)
- Escuela de Paisajismo y Jardinería Castillo de Batres (Continuing education: On-Campus and On-Line)
- Escuela Gallega del Paisaje - Fundación Juana de Vega (Semi-distance master's degree in Landscape architecture)

See Academic Degree for Spain.

=== Sweden ===
- Swedish University of Agricultural Sciences Alnarp (SLU Alnarp). Alnarp campus is located next to Malmö in the southernmost part of Sweden, and close to Denmark's capital, Copenhagen. Alnarp has one of Europe's largest campuses for education in Landscape Design, Landscape Planning, Environmental Psychology and Landscape Management and Construction. The campus area includes the arboretum Alnarpsparken (one of Sweden's largest, with over 2,500 ligneous plants) and Alnarp Rehabilitation Garden, both of which are used in the education. Alnarp Rehabilitation Garden is mainly used for research and postgraduate education on the importance of nature and gardens for people's health and well-being, where not least the importance of the landscape design is explored. These prerequisites provide opportunities for in-depth studies in various areas of landscape architecture. SLU Alnarp offers a 3-year bachelor's degree or a 5-year master's degree in landscape architecture. In addition, there is a two-year international master's program in landscape architecture, where all education is offered in English.
- Swedish University of Agricultural Sciences Ultuna (SLU Ultuna). Ultuna campus is adjacent to Uppsala, Sweden's oldest university city and close to Sweden's capital, Stockholm. SLU Ultuna offers a 3-year bachelor's degree or a 5-year master's degree in landscape architecture. In addition, there is a two-year international master's program in "Landscape Architecture for Sustainable Urbanisation", where all education is offered in English.

=== Turkey ===
- Amasya University
- Adnan Menderes University
- Akdeniz University
- Amasya University
- Ankara University
- Atatürk University
- Bartın University
- Bilkent University
- Çanakkale Onsekiz Mart University
- Çukurova University
- Düzce University
- Ege University
- Istanbul Medipol University
- Istanbul Technical University
- Istanbul University
- Işık University
- İnönü University
- Karadeniz Technical University
- Namık Kemal University
- Ordu University
- Sakarya University of Applied Sciences
- Süleyman Demirel University
- Trakya University
- Yeditepe University
- Yıldız Technical University

=== United Kingdom ===
- Edinburgh College of Art
- Birmingham City University
- Kingston University, London
- University of East London, London (MA in Landscape architect)
- University of Greenwich, London
- University of Gloucestershire
- Leeds Metropolitan University
- Manchester Metropolitan University
- University of Sheffield
- Newcastle University (only PhD and MA in Future Landscape Imaginaries)
- The Bartlett (University College London)

=== Other ===
- Faculty of Agriculture, University of Zagreb, Croatia
- Mendel University in Brno, Czech Republic
- Czech University of Life Sciences Prague in Prague, Czech Republic
- Czech Technical University in Prague in Prague, Czech Republic
- Tallinna Tehnikaülikool (Tallinn Technical University), Tallinn, Estonia
- Eesti Maaülikool (Estonian University of Life Sciences), Tartu, Estonia
- Estonian Academy of Arts, Tallinn, Estonia
- Aalto University School of Arts, Design and Architecture, Finland
- Technological Educational Institute of Eastern Macedonia and Thrace, Greece
- Technological Educational Institute of Epirus (TEI EP), Greece
- Latvia University of Life Sciences and Technologies, Jelgava, Latvia
- Vilnius Gediminas Technical University, Vilnius, Lithuania
- Delft University of Technology, Delft, Netherlands
- Wageningen University, Wageningen, Netherlands
- Warsaw University of Life Sciences, Warsaw, Poland
- Tadeusz Kościuszko Kraków University of Technology, Kraków, Poland
- Wrocław University of Environmental and Life Sciences, Wroclaw, Poland
- Faculty of Agriculture, University of Novi Sad, Serbia
- Faculty of Forestry, University of Belgrade, Serbia
- Slovak University of Agriculture Horticulture and Landscape Engineering Faculty, Nitra, Slovakia
- Sveriges Lantbruksuniversitet, Alnarp, Sweden
- Sveriges Lantbruksuniversitet, Uppsala, Sweden
- HEPIA, Geneva, Switzerland
- ETH Zurich, Zürich, Switzerland
- Hochschule für Technik Rapperswil, Rapperswil-Jona, Switzerland
- University of Copenhagen, Copenhagen, Denmark

== Asia Pacific ==
=== Australia ===
- University of Adelaide
- University of Canberra
- University of Melbourne
- University of New South Wales
- Deakin University
- Queensland University of Technology
- RMIT University
- University of Technology Sydney
- University of Western Australia

=== China ===
- Beijing Forestry University
- Tsinghua University
- Huaqiao University, Xiamen

=== Hong Kong ===
- The University of Hong Kong
- THEi
- Hong Kong Design Institute (HKDI)

=== Indonesia ===
- Trisakti University
- Bogor Agricultural University
- Bandung Institute of Technology (Master only)
- Institut Sains dan Teknologi Nasional
- Udayana University, Bali
- Sumatera Institute of Technology, Lampung

=== Japan ===
- Tokyo University of Agriculture Faculty of Regional Environmental Science Department of Landscape Architecture Science, Setagaya, Tokyo
- Tokyo University of Agriculture junior college Department of Environment and Landscape, Setagaya, Tokyo
- Chiba University (Matsudo Campus) Faculty of Horticulture, Department of Environment and Landscape, Chiba
- Minami Kyushu University Faculty of Environment and Horticulture, Department of Environment and Horticulture, Miyazaki
- Nishi-nippon Junior College, Department of Environment and Horticulture, Fukuoka
- Kyushu University Graduate School of Design, Undergraduate Schools School of Design, Department of Environmental Design, Fukuoka
- Hokkaido University School of Agriculture, Department of Environmental Horticulture and Landscape Architecture, Hokkaido
- University of Tsukuba School of Art and Design, Program in Design, Division of Environmental Design, Ibaragi
- Kyoto University Graduate School of Agriculture, Division of Forest and Biomaterials Science, Lab of Landscape Architecture, Kyoto
- Kyoto Prefectural University Graduate School of Life and Environmental Sciences, Lab of Landscape, Kyoto
- Kyoto University of the Arts Undergraduate School Department of Environmental Design, Division of Landscape Design, Kyoto
- Kyoto University of the Arts Correspondence Education Undergraduate School Department of Design, Landscape Design Course, Kyoto
- Osaka Prefecture University Graduate schools of Life and Environmental Sciences, Division of Environmental Sciences and Technology, Lab of Landscape Architecture, Osaka
- Osaka University of Arts Environmental Design Department, Osaka
- Osaka University of Arts Environmental Design Department of Correspondence Education, Osaka
- Shinshu University Faculties of Agriculture (Minami-minowa Campus), Department of Forest Science Forest Environmental Sciences, Rural Environmental Engineering, Nagano
- Tohoku University of Art and Design Department of Architecture and Environmental Design, Educational field of landscape design, Yamagata
- Miyagi University School of Project Design - Department of Spatial Design and Information Systems or School of Food, Agricultural and Environmental Sciences - Department of Environmental Sciences, Sendai, Miyagi
- Nagaoka Institute of Design Department of Architecture and Environmental Design, Educational field of landscape design, Nagaoka, Niigata
- Nagoya University of Arts Graduate Program School of Design, Department of Design, Department of Design Space Block, Nagoya, Aichi
- Kobe Design University School of Design Department of Environmental Design Educational field of landscape design, Kobe, Hyogo
- Tama Art University Department of Environmental Design, Educational field of landscape design, Tokyo
- Meiji University School of Agriculture Department of Agriculture Division of Environment, Tokyo
- Nihon University College of Bioresource Sciences Department of Plant Science and Resources Lab of Landscape Architecture, Fujisawa, Kanagawa
- Nihon University Junior College (Shonan Campus) Department of Bioresource Sciences Laboratory of Landscape Architecture and Science, Fujisawa, Kanagawa
- Tokai University (Asahikawa Campus) School of Art and Technology Department of Architecture and Environment Design, Asahikawa, Hokkaido
- University of Shiga Prefecture School of Environmental Science Department of Environment Design and Architecture, Shiga
- University of Tokyo
  - Graduate School of Agricultural and Life Sciences Department of Forest Science, Laboratories Forest Resources and Environmental Science - Forest Landscape Planning and Design, Tokyo
  - University of Tokyo Graduate School of Engineering Department of Urban Engineering, Tokyo
  - University of Tokyo Graduate School of Frontier Sciences Department of Ecosystem Studies Landscape Ecology and Planning, Tokyo
- Awaji Landscape Planning and Horticulture Academy, Awaji Island, Hyogo：University of Hyogo (Hyogo Prefectural University) Graduate School of Landscape Design and Management, Awaji Campus

=== Malaysia ===
- Universiti Teknologi Malaysia
- University Putra Malaysia
- Universiti Teknologi MARA

=== Middle East ===
- American University of Beirut, Beirut, Lebanon
- Université de Balamand, Académie Libanaise des Beaux-arts, Beirut, Lebanon
- King Abdulaziz University, Jedda, Saudi Arabia
- University of Dammam, Dammam, Saudi Arabia
- Tehran University, Tehran, Iran
- Shahid Beheshti University, Tehran, Iran
- Tarbiat Modarres University, Tehran, Iran
- Imam Khomeini International University, Qazvin, Iran
- Technion, Haifa, Israel

=== New Zealand ===
- Lincoln University, School of Landscape Architecture
- Unitec Institute of Technology
- Victoria University of Wellington

=== Philippines ===
- Bulacan State University, City of Malolos
- University of the Philippines Diliman
- University of San Carlos
- University of San Agustin, Iloilo City

=== Singapore ===
- National University of Singapore

=== South Korea ===
- Seoul National University
- Yeungnam University
- Chongju University
- University of Seoul
- Shingu College
- Kyunghee University
- Gyeongnam National University of Science and Technology
- Sungkyunkwan University
- Sangji Yongseo College
- Kyungnam College of Information and Technology
- Kyungpook National University
- Catholic University of Daegu
- Dongguk University
- Mokpo National University
- Chonnam National University
- Gachon University
- Daegu University
- Dong-A University
- Pusan National University
- Chonbuk National University
- Kangwon National University
- Sunchon University
- Woosuk University
- Honam University
- Dongshin University
- Gyeongju University
- Hyechon University
- Sangmyung University
- Kongju National University
- Hankyong National University
- Pai Chai University
- Gangneung-Wonju National University
- Joongbu University
- Sahmyook University
- Sookmyung Women's University
- Cheonan Yonam College
- Korea National University of Cultural Heritage
- Gumi College
- Dankook University
- Keimyung College University
- Wonkwang University
- Korea University
- Sangji University
- Seoul Women's University
- Byuksung College
- Kijeon University
- World Cyber College
- Dongkang College

=== Sri Lanka ===
- University of Moratuwa

=== Taiwan ===
- National Taiwan University
- Fu Jen Catholic University
- Tunghai University

Chinese Culture University

=== Thailand ===
- Chulalongkorn University, Bangkok - Faculty of Architecture (5-year bachelor's degree in Landscape Architecture)
- Maejo University, Chiang Mai - Faculty of Architecture and Environmental Design (5-year bachelor's degree in Landscape Architecture)
- Kasetsart University, Bangkok - Faculty of Architecture (5-year bachelor's degree in Landscape Architecture)
- Maha Sarakham University, Maha Sarakham
- Silpakorn University, Bangkok
- Thammasat University, Bangkok
- King Mongkut's University of Technology Thonburi, Bangkok - School of Architecture and Design (5-year bachelor's degree in Landscape Architecture - International program

== Africa ==
- Cairo University, Cairo, Egypt
- University of Pretoria, South Africa (BSc + MLA)
- University of Cape Town, South Africa (Master's program only)
- Jomo Kenyatta University of Agriculture and Technology
- University of Dschang (bachelor's program, and master's program; Ebolowa school of wood, water, and natural resources, Faculty of agronomy and agricultural sciences FAAS)
- University of Lagos, Nigeria. School of Post Graduate Studies, Department of Architecture (Masters program only)
- Ahmadu Bello University, Zaria, Kaduna State, Nigeria. School of Postgraduate Studies, Department of Architecture. (PGDLA and MLA programs only)

== See also ==
- List of professional landscape architecture organisations
