= Diane Menzies =

New Zealand landscape architect and researcher

Diane Menzies ONZM
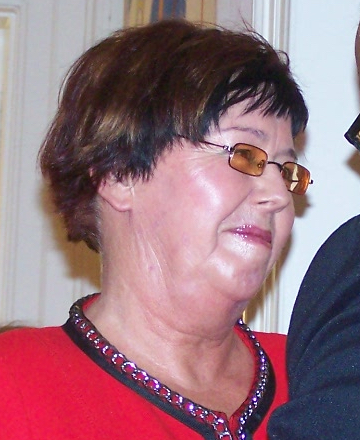
- Menzies in 2008
- Born: Diane Helen Bright
- Awards: Kāhui Whetū (Ngā Aho); Sir Geoffrey Jellicoe Award (IFLA)

Academic background
- Education: Lincoln College
- Thesis: Clean and green? Environmental quality on the New Zealand dairy farm (1999)
- Doctoral advisor: Simon Swaffield; Neil Gow

Academic work
- Discipline: Landscape architecture and resource management

Diane Helen Menzies ONZM (née Bright) is a New Zealand landscape architect. She is a former Environment Court commissioner, and served as president of the International Federation of Landscape Architects from 2006 to 2010. In 2008, she was invested as an Officer of the New Zealand Order of Merit, for services to the environment.

== Early life and family ==
Menzies was born Diane Helen Bright, the only daughter of Hazel Margaret Bright (née Kinder) and Trevor Norman Bright. Her father later became professor of banking at Massey University. In 1971, she became engaged to William Humphrey Menzies; they subsequently married and had two sons.

Menzies is of Māori descent, and affiliates to Ngāti Kahungunu iwi.

== Education and career ==
Menzies was awarded a Diploma of Horticulture with distinction by Lincoln College in 1971, and completed a Diploma in Landscape Architecture at the same institution in 1973, graduating the following May. Under the supervision of Charlie Challenger, her diploma thesis was on the recreation potential in Mākara. A contemporary of Di Lucas, Menzies was in the second cohort of women to graduate in landscape architecture from Lincoln. She later completed a PhD in resource management, also through Lincoln, titled Clean and green? Environmental quality on the New Zealand dairy farm, supervised by Simon Swaffield and Neil Gow.

Menzies spent the first part of her career at the Wellington City Council but she has also worked at the Ministry for the Environment and lectured at Unitec Institute of Technology. She wrote the introduction to Carolyn Hill's book on Māori relationships with whenua (land) and landscape, Kia Whakanuia te Whenua.

Menzies was the president of the New Zealand Institute of Landscape Architects from 1995 to 1998. She served as world president of the International Federation of Landscape Architects from 2006 to 2010. She is a former commissioner of the Environment Court of New Zealand, being first appointed in 2001.

== Honours and awards ==
Menzies is a Fellow of the New Zealand Institute of Landscape Architects, and in 2005 was made a life member. In the 2008 Queen's Birthday Honours, she was appointed an Officer of the New Zealand Order of Merit, for services to the environment. In 2015, Menzies was elected an honorary member of IFLA. In 2018, Menzies was the first woman to be accorded Kāhui Whetū status by Ngā Aho, the network of Māori design professionals, for "her contribution both nationally and internationally, of understanding the unique cultural values of the heritage of Māori and Pasifika design". Menzies said that this award means the most to her, as "it shows you can be respected in both Māori and New Zealand culture, so it’s a cultural affirmation".

In 2026, Menzies received the Sir Geoffrey Jellicoe Award from the International Federation of Landscape Architects, that institution's highest honour.
