= Rachel de Lambert =

Landscape architect in New Zealand (born 1961)

Rachel Virginia de Lambert (born 1961) is a New Zealand landscape architect and urban designer.

== Biography ==
De Lambert studied horticultural science followed by a postgraduate diploma in landscape architecture at Lincoln University. She is director of design at environmental planning and design consultancy, Boffa Miskell.

In 2022, de Lambert won two of the Property Council of New Zealand's Auckland Property People Awards. She received the Ignite Architects Urban Design Award and the Supreme Excellence Award for "creating not only practical but also appealing urban spaces".

De Lambert is one of the authors of Te Tangi a te Manu, the Aotearoa New Zealand Landscape Assessment Guidelines, which were published by Tuia Pito Ora, the New Zealand Institute of Landscape Architects, in 2022.

De Lambert is a member of the Auckland Mayoral Urban Design Task Force and the Wynyard Quarter (now Eke Panuku) Technical Advisory Group. She led the Christchurch Blueprint for the Christchurch Central Recovery Plan following the 2011 Christchurch earthquake. She has also led strategic policy development and master planning for the Waimakariri Precinct, an urban regeneration project and provided urban design and landscape input for the redevelopment of Scentre Group Newmarket.
