= Amasya University =

Public university in Amasya, Turkey

Coordinates: 40.6535°N 35.8057°E

- Amasya Üniversitesi
- Established: 17 March 2006
- Location: Amasya, Turkey
- Website: amasya.edu.tr

Amasya University (Turkish: Amasya Üniversitesi) is a university located in Amasya, Turkey. It was established on 17 March 2006.

== History ==
The history of the university goes back to 1974, when a teacher training institution was established in Amasya by the Ministry of Education. In 1975, the Ministry of Education also founded a vocational school in Amasya.

In 1982 when the Higher Education Council was established, these two schools became units of Ondokuz Mayıs University in Samsun. In the 2011-2012 academic year, Amasya University educated students through five faculties, including Education, Sciences & Arts, Architecture, Technology and Medical; one health vocational school; five vocational schools (Amasya, Merzifon, Taşova, Suluova and Gümüşhacıköy); and two institutes (Sciences and Social Sciences).

Amasya University has limited international agreements compared to other universities. Number of agreements and international programmes have been increasing rapidly. The university has some international exchange programs such as Erasmus, Grundtvig, Leonardo and Comenius. Each year limited number of students go/come from/to foreign universities by these programmes. In additionally, Farabi programme is popular for the exchange of students domestically.

== Academic Units ==
=== Faculties ===
- Faculty of Education
- Faculty of Science and Literature
- Faculty of Technology
- Faculty of Architecture
- Faculty of Medicine (cooperation with Samsun Ondokuz Mayıs University)
- Faculty of Economy and Management (not active yet)

=== Institutes ===
- Scientific Sciences Institute
- Social Sciences Institute

=== Junior College ===
- College of Health

=== Junior Technical College ===
- Amasya Junior Technical College
- Merzifon Junior Technical College
- Suluova Junior Technical College
- Gumushacikoy Junior Technical College
- Tasova Junior Technical College

=== Central Research Laboratory ===
It works depending on the university in the Campus of Ipekkoy.
