= European Foundation for Landscape Architecture =

Professional organization

The European Foundation for Landscape Architecture (EFLA) - currently IFLA EUROPE is the professional organisation for landscape architecture in Europe. It acts as a champion in the promotion of EU and Council of Europe landscape policies, directives and agreements. Membership of IFLA Europe is open to national associations for landscape architecture in countries which are members of the Council of Europe.

IFLA Europe - European Region of International Federation of Landscape Architects is a not‐for‐profit organisation that represents, supports and promotes the unique and stand‐alone profession of landscape architecture across Europe recognising excellence in educational courses and promoting best practice operations in all member countries.

Formerly established as EFLA - the European Foundation for Landscape Architecture, founded in April 1989, IFLA EUROPE is the largest of the five regions that currently comprise the International Federation of Landscape Architects (IFLA), a global organisation founded in 1946 and recognised by UNESCO as the official body representing and advancing this unique profession.

IFLA Europe has 34 members – National Associations of Landscape Architecture representing nearly 20.000 landscape architects. It aims not only at defending the landscape architecture profession, recognising excellence in educational courses and promoting the best practice operations in all member countries, but also striving to enhance the quality of landscape planning, monitoring and management in collaboration with the European Union, Council of Europe, UN and any other related organisations.

IFLA EUROPE has the following objectives:

- to promote educational study and research and the exchange of knowledge and technical information in relation to landscape and landscape architecture;

- to encourage the development of landscape architecture study courses and professional practice in the European Union, the European Economic Area and the Council of Europe, and to monitor and review their compatibility with the aims and objectives of IFLA EUROPE;

- to represent all IFLA EUROPE members within the European Union, the European Economic Area and the Council of Europe in all matters relating to the landscape;

- to consult and collaborate with the European Union, the Council of Europe and other appropriate organisations in the planning, preparation, promotion, instigation, monitoring and assessment of all programmes, directives and accords relating to the natural, semi-natural and man-made landscape and environment;

- to stimulate and promote educational exchanges among member countries of the European Union, the European Economic Area, the Council of Europe, and all IFLA EUROPE members;

- to promote and coordinate professional best-practice operations and exchanges among the member countries of the European Union, the European Economic Area and the Council of Europe and all IFLA EUROPE members;

- to promote landscape architecture and the recognition of the professional title of landscape architect as an acknowledged independent profession throughout the European Union, the European Economic Area and the Council of Europe;

- to maintain an appropriate governance structure necessarily efficient and effective to properly fulfill its aims and objectives;

- to function as the European Region of the International Federation of Landscape Architects (IFLA);

- to represent and defend the interest of all IFLA EUROPE members without prejudice to the principals of the scientific, educational, professional, learning and artistic aims and nature of IFLA EUROPE.

IFLA Europe is participating NGO with the Council of Europe and contributes to the CoE European Landscape Convention. IFLA Europe works closely with ECLAS (the European Council of Landscape Architecture Schools) and ELASA (the European Landscape Architecture Students' Association), and participates in the Le:Notre thematic network.
