= Di Lucas =

New Zealand landscape architect and environmental planner

Di Lucas ONZM
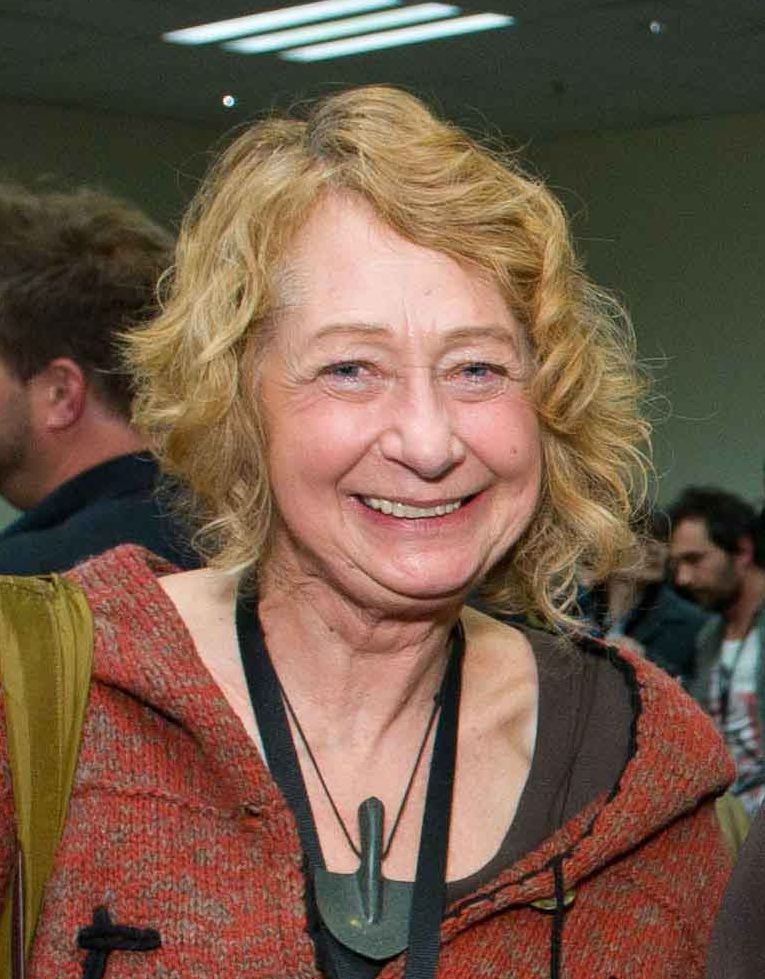
- Lucas in 2012
- Born: Diane Jean Lucas; 30 November 1950 (age 75); Cromwell, New Zealand
- Education: University of Otago; Lincoln University
- Occupation: Landscape architect

Diane Jean Lucas ONZM (born 30 November 1950) is a New Zealand landscape architect and environmental planner known for her conservation works, and particularly in and around Christchurch, Banks Peninsula and the Canterbury Plains and South Island High Country. She is a strong advocate for the protection of natural and indigenous ecosystems, and sustainable rural management.

== Biography ==
Lucas was born on 30 November 1950, the daughter of Elsie Lilian Lucas (née King) and Richard Freer Lucas. She grew up on Bendigo Station in the Otago high country, and learnt about conservation early from both her parents and the rugged landscape. After finishing her secondary education at St Hilda's Collegiate School in Dunedin, Lucas earned a Bachelor of Science degree in botany at the University of Otago in 1971, and went on to complete a postgraduate diploma in landscape architecture at Lincoln College.

She initially worked for the Ministry of Works and Development, but resigned during the Robert Muldoon era saying she could not work under a government whose policies adversely affected New Zealand’s biodiversity and natural rural landscapes. She set up a practice in Geraldine advising rural landowners on sustainable management, and is the director of Lucas Associates Limited, now based in Christchurch. For decades, her projects and publications have informed and improved urban design, native plantings, waterway restoration, Resource Management Act (RMA) planning, forestry and high country management.

Her many professional and voluntary roles include time with the Natural Heritage Fund, the Department of Conservation, the New Zealand Conservation Authority, the New Zealand Environmental Council, Ngā Whenua Rāhui (a fund that assists Māori Land owners with protection of indigenous ecosystems), the New Zealand Institute of Landscape Architects (NZILA), Federated Farmers, the New Zealand Farm Forestry Association, and the Christchurch City Council Urban Design Panel. She has also served as president of NZILA, a commissioner at RMA hearings, and judge for the Canterbury Heritage Awards.

From 1995 to 1997, she researched native plant species suitable for home gardeners to grow in their neighbourhood. Together with the Christchurch-Otautahi Agenda 21 committee, she published her research in a set of four booklets on several different areas, entitled Indigenous Ecosystems of Otautahi Christchurch. The booklets include a street map of Christchurch overlaid on a map of the Canterbury Plains ecosystems and soil types. The ecosystems range from old wetlands to forest, through to younger tussock grasslands. In addition, the booklets provide a guide for nurseries and the public about which native trees, shrubs, climbers and groundcovers naturally belong in different areas.

At the time of the Christchurch earthquakes, she warned that old streams have 'memories'. A map of the city drawn up in 1850 showed a number of old waterways that had since been filled in with gravel and built on. Many badly earthquake damaged buildings were sited on top of these old streams.

== Honours and awards ==
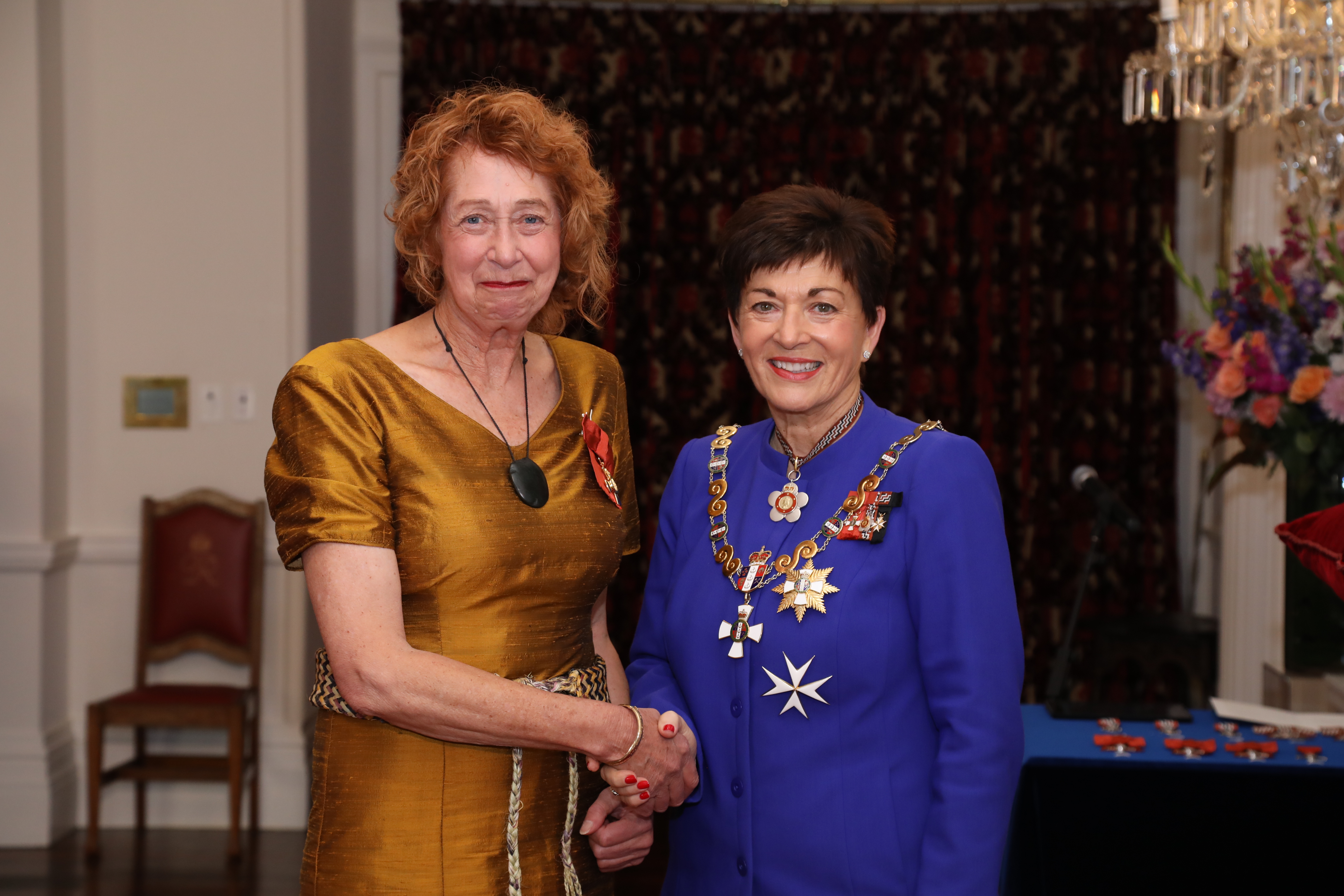
Lucas (left) in 2019, after her investiture as an Officer of the New Zealand Order of Merit by the governor-general, Dame Patsy Reddy, at Government House, Wellington

In 1990, Lucas received the New Zealand 1990 Commemoration Medal, and three years later she was awarded the New Zealand Suffrage Centennial Medal 1993. In the 2019 New Year Honours, Lucas was appointed an Officer of the New Zealand Order of Merit, for services to conservation

== Selected publications ==
- Storyscapes: Regeneration of the Port and Banks Peninsula Hills, 2010 (contributor)
- Indigenous Ecosystems of Otautahi Christchurch
  - Set 1, The Plains of Riccarton-Wigram & Spreydon-Heathcote, 1995
  - Set 2, The Coastal Plains of Hagley-Ferrymead & Burwood-Pegasus, 1996
  - Set 3, The Plains of Shirley-Papanui & Fendalton-Waimairi, 1996
  - Set 4, The Port Hills of Christchurch City, 1997
- The Merivale Plan: Developed Through A Community Planning Workshop, 1996
- The Shape of Christchurch Within the Frame of the 4 Avenues: A Plan Developed Through the Inner City Charrette, 1995
- Woodlots in the Landscape, 1987
- Landscape Guidelines for Rural South Canterbury, 1981
