= Jacky Bowring =

New Zealand landscape architect, contemporary, active in England

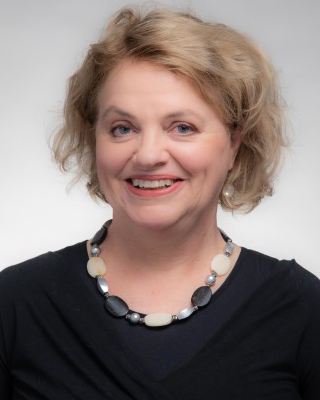
- Bowring in 2021
- Education: Lincoln University
- Scientific career
- Fields: landscape architecture
- Workplaces: Lincoln University
- Thesis: Institutionalising the picturesque: the discourse of the New Zealand Institute of Landscape Architects (1997)
- Website: http://www.lincoln.ac.nz/About-Lincoln/Staff-Profiles/?StaffID=Bowring%20Jacky

Jacky Bowring (sometimes Jacqueline) CRSNZ is a New Zealand landscape architecture academic specialising in memories and memorials. She was currently a full professor at Lincoln University. In 2024 Bowring was elected a Companion of the Royal Society Te Apārangi.

== Academic career ==
After a BSc (Hons) at the University of Canterbury, Bowring completed a diploma and then a PhD in landscape architecture at Lincoln University. Bowring said that she studied science after failing to get into a graphic arts course she had applied for. She credits her interest in landscape design to a television programme on Capability Brown. Working in the UK for three years, Bowring became interested in cemetery and memorial design. Joining the staff at Lincoln University, Bowring rose to full professor in 2013.

Bowring's 2015 book A Field Guide to Melancholy was reviewed in The Guardian.

In 2017, Bowring was one of five winners in an LA+Journal competition to design an island, for which she took inspiration from Howland Island.

Bowring has been a part of the public discussion about the rebuilding of Christchurch after the 2011 Christchurch earthquake. She travelled to Washington DC as a member of the six final teams competing to design the Pentagon Memorial. She has also been involved or advised on memorials in New Zealand, including Pukeahu National War Memorial Park, the Pike River Mine Disaster memorial, and the Erebus Memorial, and was part of a team that designed improvements to the setting of the Kate Sheppard Memorial in Christchurch.

Bowring was awarded the inaugural Michèle Whitecliffe Art Writing Prize by the Auckland Art Gallery Toi o Tāmaki for her essay "Art Therapy".

In 2024 Bowring was elected a Companion of the Royal Society Te Apārangi, for her "innovative career and scholarship in landscape architecture".

== Selected works ==
- Egoz, Shelley, Jacky Bowring, and Harvey C. Perkins. "Tastes in tension: form, function, and meaning in New Zealand’s farmed landscapes." Landscape and Urban Planning 57, no. 3-4 (2001): 177–196.
- Bowring, Jacky. A Field Guide to Melancholy. Oldcastle Books, 2015.
- Egoz, Shelley, Jacky Bowring, and Harvey C. Perkins. "Making a 'mess' in the countryside: Organic farming and the threats to sense of place." Landscape Journal 25, no. 1 (2006): 54–66.
- Vallance, Suzanne, Harvey C. Perkins, Jacky Bowring, and Jennifer E. Dixon. "Almost invisible: Glimpsing the city and its residents in the urban sustainability discourse." Urban Studies 49, no. 8 (2012): 1695–1710.
- Egoz, Shelley, and Jacky Bowring. "Beyond the romantic and naive: the search for a complex ecological aesthetic design language for landscape architecture in New Zealand." Landscape research 29, no. 1 (2004): 57–73.
