= Edgar Taylor (horticulturist) =

New Zealand horticulturist and landscape architect

Edgar Taylor (1886–1979) was a notable New Zealand horticulturist and landscape architect. He was born in London, England in 1886.
