= International Federation of Landscape Architects =

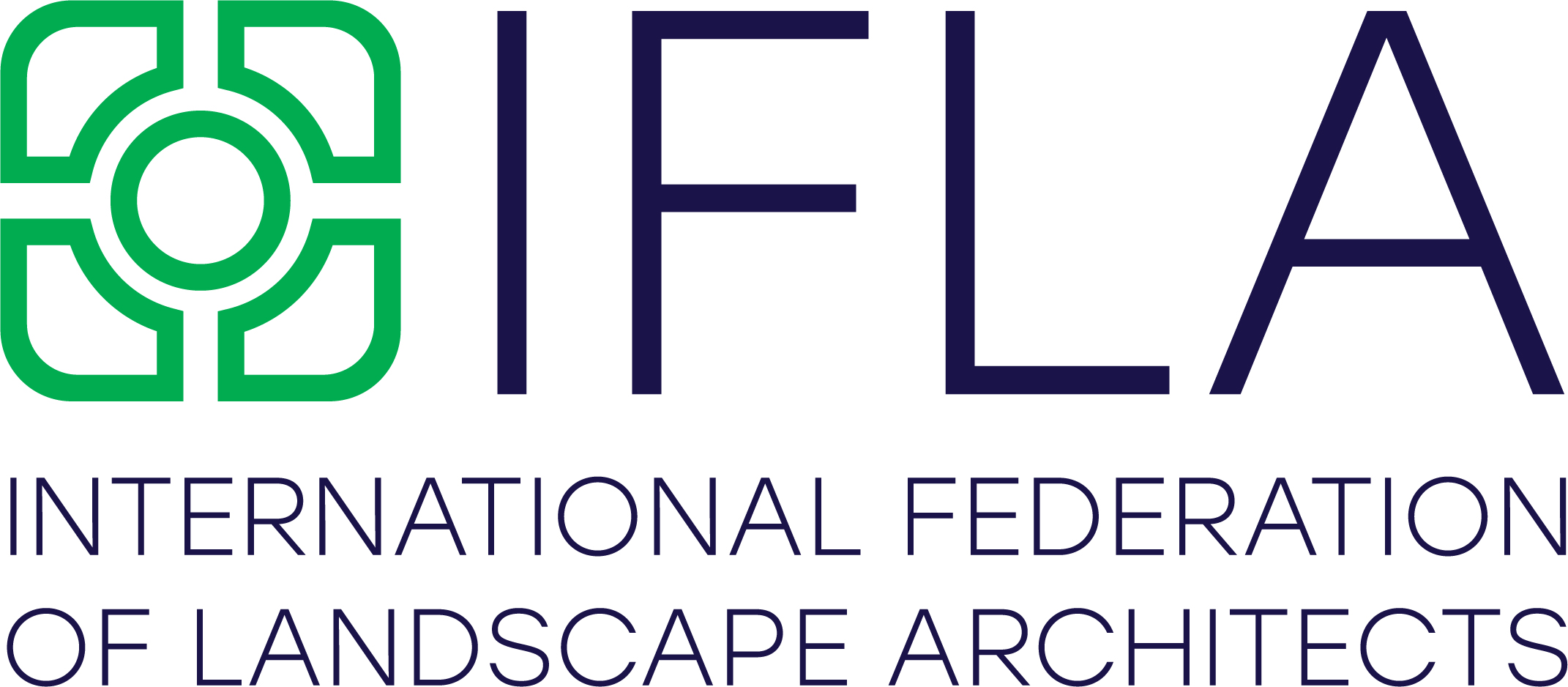

The International Federation of Landscape Architects (IFLA) is an organisation which represents the landscape architectural profession globally. It aims to provide leadership and networks to support the development of the profession and its effective participation in the realization of attractive, equitable and sustainable environments. IFLA currently represents 80 member associations from Africa, the Americas, Asia Pacific, the Middle East and Europe. The Federation's mission is to create globally sustainable and balanced living environments for the benefit of humanity worldwide. IFLA APR

Through its Member Associations, IFLA officially represents approximately 100,000 landscape architects across the world – the actual number of landscape architects is estimated to be more than 1 million globally.

IFLA has 11 aims:

1. To increase respect for the profession through the high esteem in which the Federation is held by international and regional organisations, including various United Nations Agencies.
2. To provide a platform for the exchange of knowledge and expertise.
3. To offer powerful institutional support to fight legislative threats to the integrity of the profession.
4. To provide a global platform for educational and professional opportunities.
5. To serve as a repository of information concerning landscape architecture, its heritage and capacities.
6. To grant access to projects which provide value to landscape architects at every stage of their career such as the Global Professional Standards Survey, Student Design Competition, Sir Geoffrey Jellicoe Award.
7. To raise the profile of the profession worldwide by supporting the development of new member associations and regions.
8. To provide access to international thought leaders demonstrating the capacity of landscape to meet global challenges such as water and food security, climate change, conflict, migration and depletion of natural resources.
9. To provide a global platform for engaging landscape architects (and those from related industries) in improving the conditions, aims and context of the profession long-term.

The governing body of IFLA is its World Council which comprises officers of the Executive Committee and the duly appointed delegates of the member associations which have been admitted to IFLA as members.

The IFLA Executive Committee develops and implements an action plan which realises three key strategic pillars of i) raising the profile of the profession; ii) building advocacy and; iii) providing member services that serve anyone connected to landscape architecture. IFLA's work is primarily delivered through projects, a matrix of working groups and collaboration with national, regional and international partners.

== History ==
IFLA was founded at Cambridge, England, in 1948 with Sir Geoffrey Jellicoe as its first president, representing 15 countries from Europe and North America. Later, in 1978, IFLA's Headquarters were established in Versailles. Presently IFLA's Headquarters are in Paris.

== Presidents ==
Date	Name	Notes
1948 – 1954	Sir Geoffrey JELLICOE (GBR) †	President of Honour
1954–1956	Mr. Walter LEDER (CH) †	
1956–1958	Mr. René PECHERE (BEL) †	
1958–1962	Mr. Sidney SHURCLIFF (USA) †	
1962–1966	Mr. Francisco CABRAL (PRT) †	
1966–1968	Mr. Richard SCHREINER (DEU) †	
1969	Dame Sylvia CROWE (GBR) †	
1970–1974	Mr. Olaf ASPESAETER (NOR) †	
1974–1976	Mr. Hubert B. OWENS (USA) †	
1976–1978	Mr. Floris G. BREMAN (PRT) †	
1978–1982	Mr. Hans F. WERKMEISTER (DEU) †	
1982–1986	Mr. Zvi MILLER (ISR) †	President Emeritus
1986–1990	Mr. Mihàli MÖCSENYI (HUN) †	
1990–1992	Mr. Theodore OSMUNDSON (USA) †	
1992–1996	Mr. George L. ANAGNOSTOPOULOS (GRC) †	
1996–2000	Mr. Arno Sighart SCHMID (DEU)	
2000–2002	Mr. Richard L.P. TAN (SGP) †	
2002–2006	Ms. Martha Cecilia FAJARDO (COL)	
2006–2010	Dr. Diane H. MENZIES (NZ)	
2010–2014	Ms. Désirée Martínez de URIARTE (MX)	
2014 - 2018	Prof. Kathryn MOORE (UK)	
2018 - 2022	Prof. James HAYTER (AUS)	
2022 -	Dr. Bruno MARQUES (PRT/NZ)	
