= Julie Payette =

29th governor general of Canada, former CSA Astronaut (born 1963)

The Right Honourable Julie Payette CC CMM COM CQ CD FCAE
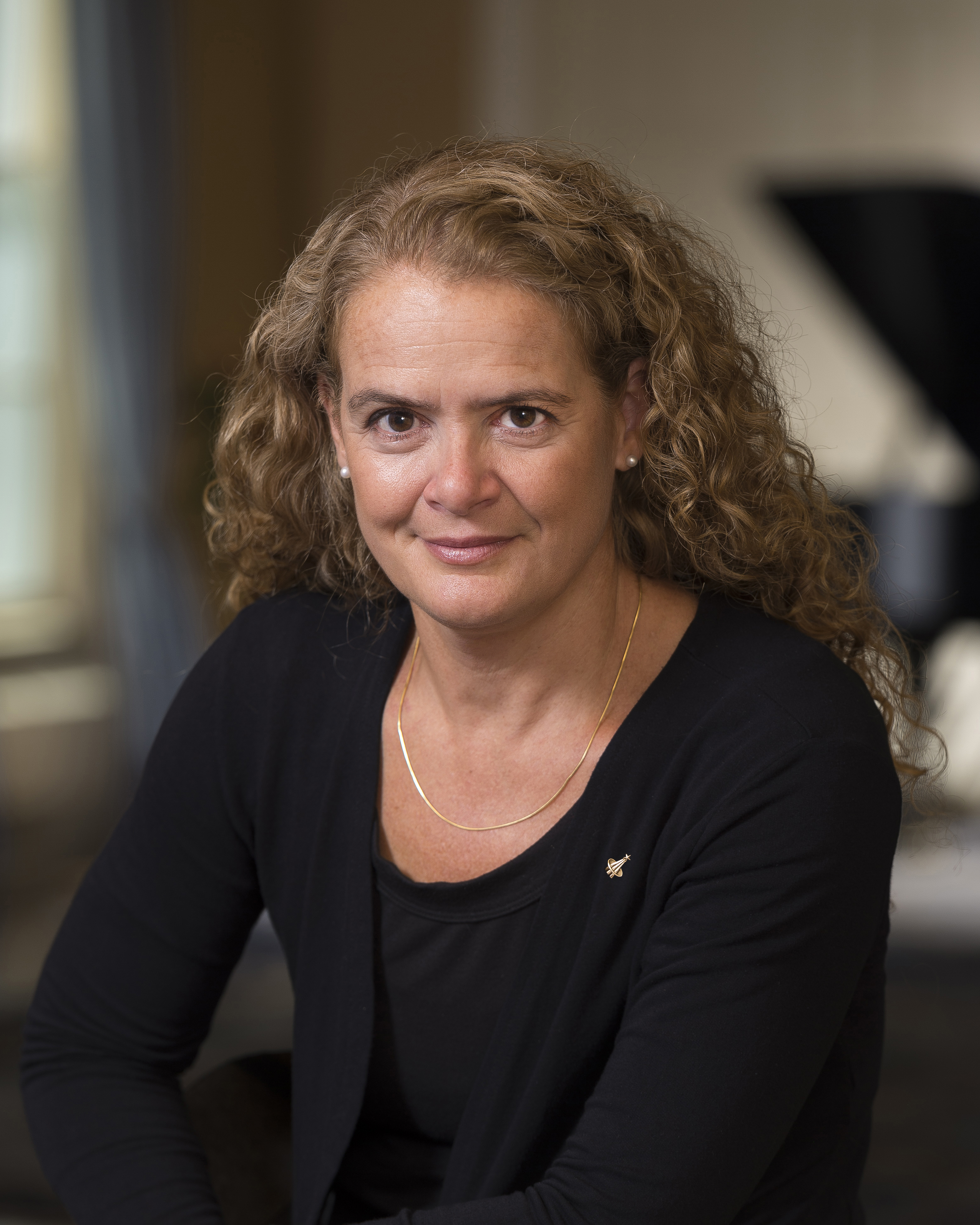
- Official portrait, 2017

29th Governor General of Canada
- In office October 2, 2017 – January 22, 2021
- Monarch: Elizabeth II
- Prime Minister: Justin Trudeau
- Preceded by: David Johnston
- Succeeded by: Mary Simon

Personal details
- Born: October 20, 1963 (age 63) Montreal, Quebec, Canada
- Spouses: François Brissette (m. 1992; div. 1999) William Flynn (m. 2001; div. 2015)
- Children: 1
- Education: McGill University (BEng); University of Toronto (MASc)
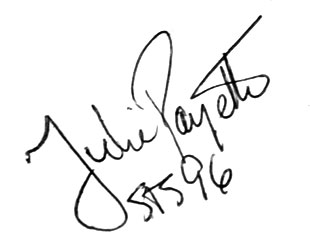
- Signature
- Space career

CSA astronaut
- Time in space: 25 days, 11 hours, 57 minutes
- Selection: 1992 CSA Group; NASA Group 16 (1996)
- Mission: STS-96; STS-127

Julie Payette (French pronunciation: [ʒyli pajɛt]; born October 20, 1963) is a Canadian engineer, scientist and former astronaut who served as the 29th governor general of Canada from 2017 to 2021.

Payette holds engineering degrees from McGill University and the University of Toronto. She worked as a research scientist before joining the Canadian Space Agency (CSA) in 1992 as a member of the Canadian Astronaut Corps. She completed two spaceflights, STS-96 and STS-127, and has logged more than 25 days in space. She also served as capsule communicator at NASA Mission Control Center in Houston and from 2000 to 2007 as CSA's chief astronaut.

In July 2013, Payette was named chief operating officer for the Montreal Science Centre. She also held a number of board appointments, including the National Bank of Canada. On July 13, 2017, Prime Minister Justin Trudeau announced that Queen Elizabeth II had approved the appointment of Payette as the next governor general of Canada. She was invested on October 2, 2017.

Payette resigned on January 21, 2021, following the conclusion of a workplace review that found she had "belittled, berated and publicly humiliated Rideau Hall staff" and "created a toxic, verbally abusive workplace". The review was initiated by the Privy Council Office to investigate accusations of harassment of civil servants in the Office of the Governor General. The report's official goal was not to validate nor make findings of fact, as it only relied on what interview participants reported.

She is the second governor general to have resigned the office (the first being Roméo LeBlanc, who resigned due to health issues); the first to resign due to scandal; and the first to have left a vacancy upon resignation.

== Education and early career ==
Payette was born on October 20, 1963, in Montreal, Quebec, and lived in the Ahuntsic neighbourhood, attending Collège Mont-Saint-Louis and Collège Regina Assumpta. In 1982 she completed an International Baccalaureate diploma at the United World College of the Atlantic in South Wales, United Kingdom.

For her undergraduate studies, Payette enrolled in McGill University where she completed a Bachelor of Engineering degree in electrical engineering in 1986, after which she completed a Master of Applied Science degree in computer engineering at the University of Toronto in 1990. Her thesis focused on computational linguistics, a field of artificial intelligence. She is a retired member of the Ordre des ingénieurs du Québec.

She speaks French and English, some Spanish, Italian, Russian and German.

During her schooling, between 1986 and 1988, Payette also worked as a systems engineer for IBM Canada's Science Engineering division. From 1988 to 1990, as a graduate student at the University of Toronto, she was involved in a high-performance computer architecture project and worked as a teaching assistant. At the beginning of 1991, Payette joined the communications and science department of the IBM Zurich Research Laboratory in Switzerland, for a one-year visiting scientist appointment. When she returned to Canada, in January 1992, she joined the Speech Research Group of Bell-Northern Research in Montreal where she was responsible for a project in telephone speech comprehension using computer voice recognition.

== Canadian Space Agency ==
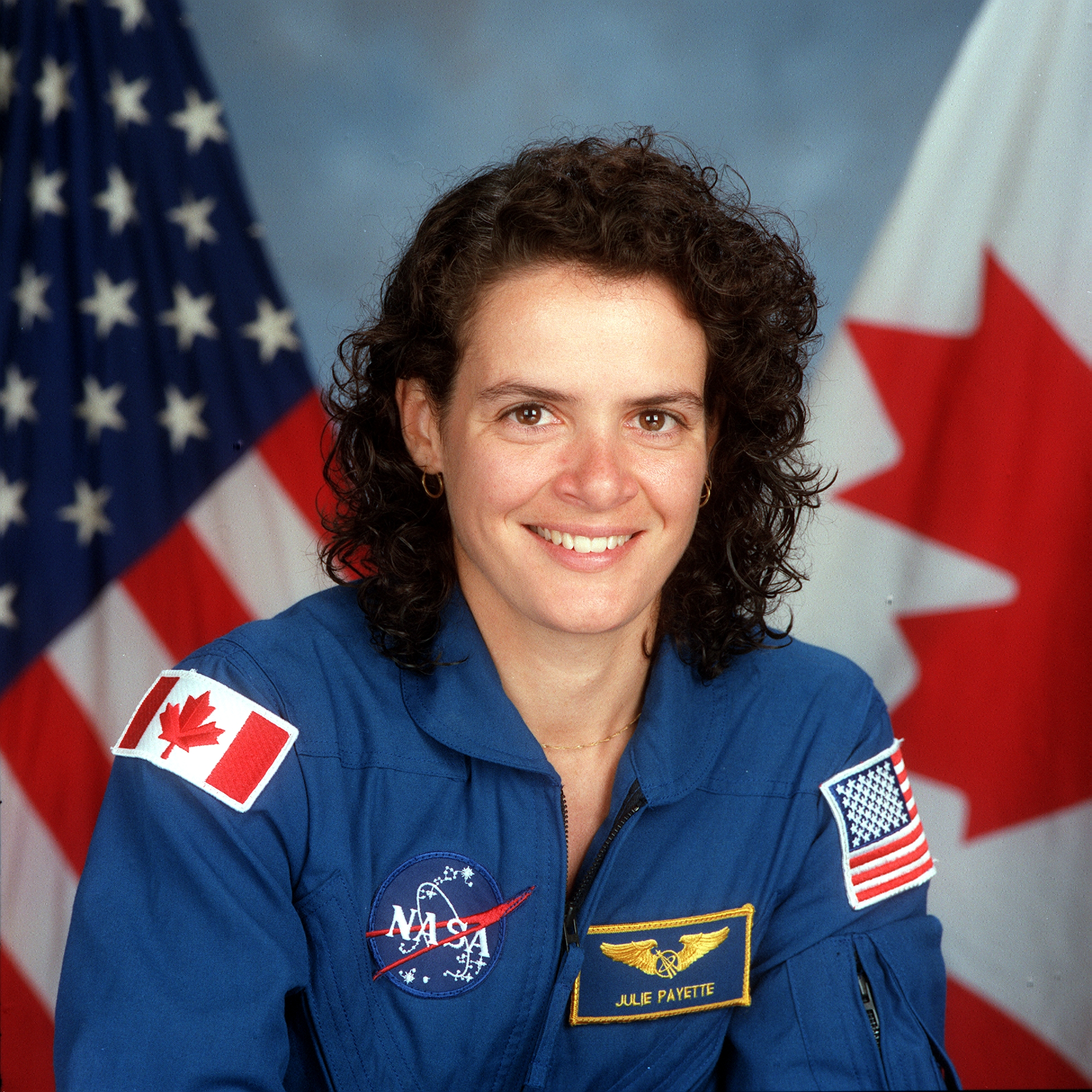
Payette's official portrait from STS-96

Payette was selected by the Canadian Space Agency (CSA) as one of four astronauts from a field of 5,330 applicants in June 1992. After undergoing basic training in Canada, she worked as a technical advisor for the Mobile Servicing System, an advanced robotics system and Canada's contribution to the International Space Station. In 1993, Payette established the Human-Computer Interaction Group at the Canadian Astronaut Program and served as a technical specialist on the NATO International Research Study Group on speech processing.

In preparation for a space assignment, Payette obtained her commercial pilot licence and logged 120 hours as a research operator on reduced gravity aircraft. In April 1996, Payette was certified as a one-atmosphere deep sea diving suit operator. Payette obtained her captaincy on the CT-114 Tutor military jet at CFB Moose Jaw in February 1996 and her military instrument rating in 1997. Payette has logged more than 1,300 hours of flight time, including 600 hours on high-performance jet aircraft.

Payette reported to the Johnson Space Center in August 1996 to begin mission specialist training. After completing one year of training, she was assigned to work on the Mobile Servicing System. Payette completed the initial astronaut training in April 1998.

=== Spaceflight experience ===
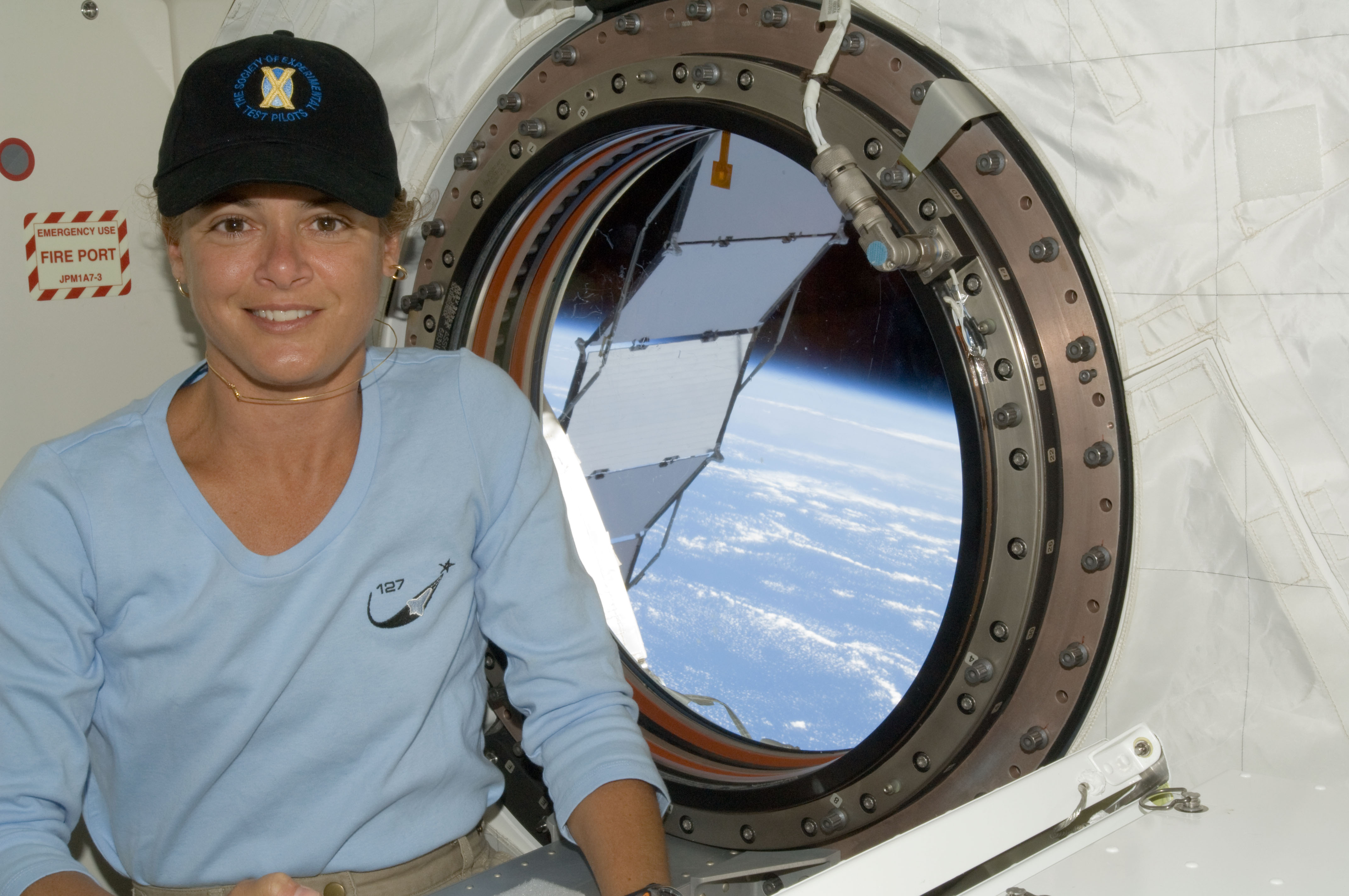
Payette aboard the Kibō laboratory of the International Space Station during STS-127

Payette served as chief astronaut for the Canadian Space Agency from 2000 to 2007. She also worked as capsule communicator at the Mission Control Center in Houston for several years, including the return to flight mission STS-114. She was lead capsule communicator during STS-121.

==== STS-96 ====
Payette flew on the Space Shuttle Discovery from May 27 to June 6, 1999, as part of the crew of STS-96. During the mission, the crew performed the first manual docking of the shuttle to the International Space Station, and delivered four tons of logistics and supplies to the station. On Discovery, Payette served as a mission specialist. Her main responsibility was to operate the Canadarm robotic arm from the space station. The STS-96 mission was accomplished in 153 orbits of the Earth, traveling over six million kilometres (3,700,000 mi) in 9 days, 19 hours and 13 minutes. Payette became the first Canadian to participate in an ISS assembly mission and to board the Space Station.

==== STS-127 ====
Payette visited the space station again in 2009 as a mission specialist aboard Space Shuttle Endeavour during mission STS-127 from July 15 to 31, 2009, and was the flight engineer and lead robotic operator during the mission. At that time, Robert Thirsk was a member of Expedition 20 on the space station. Endeavour's docking at the space station marked the first time two Canadians met in space.

During her second mission, Payette brought a signed sweater of the famed Montreal Canadiens player Maurice Richard, stating she had brought Richard, who was known as "The Rocket", into the rocket to celebrate the hockey team's 100th anniversary.

== Post-CSA ==
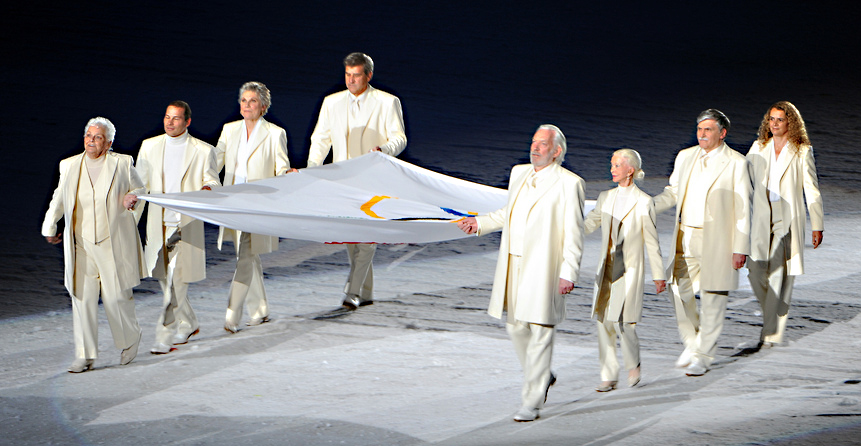
Several notable Canadians, including Payette (right back), carrying the Olympic flag at the 2010 Winter Olympics opening ceremony in Vancouver

During 2011–2013, she worked at the Woodrow Wilson International Center for Scholars in Washington, D.C., and was also a scientific delegate to the United States for the Quebec Government.

For the next three years, Payette was chief operating officer of the Montreal Science Centre of the Société du Vieux-Port de Montréal. During that time, she was also a vice president of the Canada Lands Company. She abruptly left the Science Centre after a prolonged strike, as she was tired of the battles that came with her position. Prior to her departure numerous employees came forward alleging verbal abuse that created a hostile working environment, as Payette was "intimidating" and "determined to be very hands-on and in control of every aspect".

In April 2016, Payette was appointed to the board of the Canadian Olympic Committee, and attended the 2016 Summer Olympics. She left the Canadian Olympic Committee in 2017 after two internal investigations into her treatment of staff including verbal harassment. In about 2017, she was appointed to the International Olympic Committee's Women in Sports Commission.

Payette has served on boards of directors, at Queen's University, Canada's Own the Podium Olympic program, Montreal Science Centre foundation, Robotique FIRST Québec, Drug Free Kids Canada, the Montreal Bach Festival, the National Bank of Canada, Développement Aéroport Saint-Hubert de Longueuil, and others. She is a member of the Ordre des ingénieurs du Québec and a fellow of the International Academy of Astronautics. As well, Payette is a member of the Faculty of Engineering Advisory Board of McGill University.

== Governor General of Canada ==
Payette was announced on July 13, 2017, as Prime Minister Justin Trudeau's recommendation to be the 29th Governor General of Canada. She was scheduled to take office October 2, 2017, after the completion of briefings from the incumbent, David Johnston. After the announcement was made, Johnston issued a statement congratulating Payette and welcoming "a Canadian of extraordinary achievement, admired by all".

As governor general-designate, Payette had her first official meeting with Queen Elizabeth II on September 20, 2017, at Balmoral Castle, when she was also invested by Her Majesty as an extraordinary Companion of the Order of Canada (CC), an extraordinary Commander of the Order of Military Merit (CMM), and a Commander of the Order of Merit of the Police Forces (COM).

Payette was installed as governor general on October 2, 2017. Afterwards, she urged Canadians to work together on issues such as climate change, migration and poverty. "Anyone can accomplish anything and rise to the challenge as long as they are willing to work with others, to let go of the personal agenda, to reach a higher goal and to do what is right for the common good. This is exactly what I hope my mandate as the governor-general will reflect", Payette said.

=== Tenure ===
As she was completing her first year as the viceregal representative in September 2018, Payette faced some criticism about controversial comments she had made against those who believe in creationism and those who did not believe in climate change. At the Canadian Science Policy Conference the next month, she argued strongly for greater public acceptance of science, saying that too many people believe in astrology, deny climate change, and believe that "maybe taking a sugar pill will cure cancer". A Skeptical Inquirer article described her remarks as "refreshing". George Dvorsky from Gizmodo.com stated "Her words were a breath of fresh air".

In subsequent comments, Payette emphasized the importance of debate and critical thinking but admitted that she was still growing into her role and needed more time to adapt to the position. "I learned that you have to be careful about how you say things, but not what you say", she added. Some time later, she offered an additional explanation to CPAC. "I made a speech as I had as an astronaut and I'm not an astronaut any longer, I'm governor general. I represent all Canadians. I've learned those lessons."

Weeks later, she faced criticism about her work ethic, with some suggesting that she had not devoted enough time and dedication to the role of governor general, noting that she had not visited several of the provinces in her nearly 12-month tenure. The Toronto Star published specifics confirming the more numerous appearances her two predecessors had made per year. Rideau Hall spokesperson Marie-Ève Létourneau said that "The first year of every mandate is a period of learning, adjustment and adaptation from both the Governor General and Rideau Hall staff." The Governor General office's lengthy review of patronage activities, that her predecessors had automatically done by longstanding tradition, left several established non-profit groups without committed support from the office and facing organizational changes.

Later in September, the Governor General's office confirmed that Payette would not preside over the 2018 Governor General's History Awards ceremony.

On September 27, Payette acknowledged the articles that had painted an "unfavourable image of our work" in an e-mail to staff, expressed regret about the effect of the criticisms on morale, and assured them that she was "very proud of all we have achieved together to date".

During Payette's tenure, the media also raised concerns over questionable spending projects at Rideau Hall and her refusal to move in to Rideau Hall after renovations were complete. It was reported that the spending included around $140,000 on "studying and designing a private staircase that was never built" and $117,500 on "a gate and series of doors to keep people away from Payette's office". With much of the grounds of Rideau Hall open to the public, it was, however, recognized that there were current accessibility, privacy and security concerns, especially in light of the July 2nd security breach on the grounds by Corey Hurren.

=== Resignation ===
On July 21, 2020, CBC News reported that Payette had created a toxic work environment at Rideau Hall by verbally abusing employees. Two days later, spurred on by the CBC News report, the Privy Council Office formally launched an investigation into her conduct. Many former employees of the Montreal Science Centre told the National Post they witnessed similarly abusive behaviour by Payette in her time at the institution, although others described her behaviour as the result of rigorously high standards. Payette said that she supported the investigation into the workplace harassment. The Privy Council Office's independent report found that Payette presided over a toxic work environment, detailing "yelling, screaming, aggressive conduct, demeaning comments and public humiliations."

On January 21, 2021, in what CBC News described as "an unprecedented move", Payette announced her resignation as governor general (which was effective the following day) after the completion of an independent workplace review of several claims of workplace harassment (in the form of, "belittling, berating and publicly humiliating" staff), as remaining in her post "would risk inflicting serious damage on the office". The secretary to the governor general, despite being a longtime friend, had played a critical role in Payette's downfall. Payette's commission as Governor General was formally terminated by royal letters patent issued on January 22.

Richard Wagner, the Chief Justice of Canada, was sworn in as Administrator on January 23, 2021.

Trudeau was criticized by 15 sources interviewed by the CBC for failing to vet Payette properly, as the PMO did not conduct checks with Payette's past employers (Montreal Science Centre and Canadian Olympic Committee) that could have uncovered that her style and temperament were unsuited for the diplomatically sensitive and public role of Governor General.

As a result of her resignation, renewed scrutiny arose around the pension and benefits afforded to retired governors general. Under current law, she will receive a lifetime pension of nearly $150,000 and also can claim an additional $206,000 in expenses each year. Carleton University academic Philippe Lagassé has speculated that Payette's decision to resign may have been motivated by her desire to protect her entitlements, as Parliament would be unlikely to retroactively reduce them.

== Personal life ==
Payette has been married and divorced twice, first to François Brissette in the 1990s, and secondly to William Flynn, with whom she had a son in 2003, and from whom she divorced in 2015.

Payette plays the piano and has sung with the Montreal Symphony Orchestra and Tafelmusik Chamber Choir. Currently, she sings with the Ottawa Bach Choir. Among her other hobbies are running, skiing, racquet sports, and scuba diving.

=== Legal issues ===
In July 2011, Payette was driving and struck and killed a pedestrian who had stepped off a curb to cross the road. The case was closed in 2012 as she was found not at fault.

She was also charged with second degree assault in Maryland, on November 24, 2011. At least one anonymously quoted source has alleged that the victim of the assault was her then-husband, William Flynn. Though the charges were later dropped, the couple split several weeks later and subsequently divorced. Payette has stated that charges were "unfounded" but refused to comment further on the circumstances leading to her being charged with assault. These incidents raised questions on the vetting process as she had been selected by Prime Minister Trudeau without consulting an ad hoc committee of experts. Such a committee was the means by which outgoing Governor General David Johnston had been selected by the Conservative government of Stephen Harper. Once Payette was named Governor General-designate, media organizations pressed for the release of the divorce records, which Payette initially attempted to keep sealed before abandoning the bid.

== Honours ==
Viceregal styles of Julie Payette (2017–2021)
- Reference style: Her Excellency the Right Honourable; Son Excellence la très honorable
- Spoken style: Your Excellency; Votre Excellence

Appointments

- 2000 – Knight of the National Order of Quebec
- June 10, 2010 – Member of the Canadian Aviation Hall of Fame
- May 6, 2010 – September 20, 2017: Officer of the Order of Canada (OC)
  - September 20, 2017 – October 2, 2017: Companion of the Order of Canada (CC)
  - October 2, 2017 – January 21, 2021: Chancellor and Principal and extraordinary Companion of the Order of Canada (CC)
  - January 21, 2021 – : Extraordinary Companion of the Order of Canada (CC)
- 2013 – Academy of Great Montrealers (Scientific category)
- 2016 – Commander of the Order of Montreal
- September 20, 2017 – October 2, 2017: Commander of the Order of Military Merit (CMM)
  - October 2, 2017 – January 21, 2021: Chancellor and extraordinary Commander of the Order of Military Merit (CMM)
  - January 21, 2021 – : Extraordinary Commander of the Order of Military Merit (CMM)
- September 20, 2017 – October 2, 2017: Commander of the Order of Merit of the Police Forces (COM)
  - October 2, 2017 – January 21, 2021: Chancellor and Commander of the Order of Merit of the Police Forces (COM)
  - January 21, 2021 – : Commander of the Order of Merit of the Police Forces (COM)
- October 2, 2017 – January 21, 2021: Patron Scout of Canada
- October 2, 2017 – January 21, 2021: Honorary Chief Commissioner of the Canadian Coast Guard

Medals

- 2012 – Queen Elizabeth II Diamond Jubilee Medal
- September 28, 2017 – Canadian Forces' Decoration

Foreign honours

- June 6, 1999 – NASA Space Flight Medal
- 2001 – Knight of Ordre de la Pléiade de l'Association des parlementaires de langue française
- June 25, 2010 – NASA Exceptional Service Medal
- October 25, 2018 – Grand Cross of National Order of Merit of Burkina Faso

=== Honorary military appointments ===
- October 2, 2017 – January 21, 2021: Colonel of the Governor General's Horse Guards
- October 2, 2017 – January 21, 2021: Colonel of the Governor General's Foot Guards
- October 2, 2017 – January 21, 2021: Colonel of the Canadian Grenadier Guards

=== Honorary degrees ===
Payette holds 28 honorary doctorates, Some of the honorary degrees she has received:

- 1999 – Queen's University, Doctor of Science (DSc)
- 1999 – University of Ottawa, Doctor of the University (DUniv)
- March 10, 2000 – Simon Fraser University, Doctor of Laws (LLD)
- 2000 – Université Laval, Doctorate
- 2001 – University of Regina, Doctorate
- 2001 – Royal Roads University, Doctorate
- June 13, 2001 – University of Toronto, Doctor of Science (DSc)
- June 2002 – University of Victoria, Doctor of Science (DSc)
- 2002 – Nipissing University, Doctor of Letters (DLitt)
- June 3, 2003 – McGill University, Doctor of Science (DSc)
- 2004 – Mount Saint Vincent University, Doctor of Humane Letters (DHL)
- June 2004: McMaster University, Doctor of Science (DSc)
- 2005 – University of Lethbridge, Doctor of Science (DSc)
- 2005 – Mount Allison University
- 2006 – University of Alberta, Doctorate
- November 25, 2010: University of British Columbia, Doctor of Science (DSc)
- 2010 – York University, Doctor of Science (DSc)
- June 2010: Concordia University, Doctor of Science (DSc)
- 2010 – University of Waterloo, Doctor of Science (DSc)
- 2011 – Niagara University, Doctor of Laws (LLD)
- 2011 – Ryerson University, Doctor of Engineering (DEng)
- 2012 – Carleton University, Doctor of Engineering (DEng)
- June 4, 2012: Vancouver Island University, Doctor of Technology (DTech)
- 2013 – University of Moncton
- May 30, 2013 – University of Manitoba, Doctor of Science (DSc)
- June 10, 2013 – University of Calgary, Doctor of Laws (LLD)
- June 23, 2016 – British Columbia Institute of Technology, Doctor of Technology (DTech)
- June 1, 2018 – Université de Montréal

=== Honorific eponyms ===
Schools

- Julie Payette Public School, Whitby

=== Other honours ===
Payette assisted in the carrying of the Olympic flag in the opening ceremonies of the 2010 Olympic Winter Games in Vancouver, British Columbia. She also attended the opening ceremony of the Pyeongchang Olympics eight years later.

== Arms ==
Coat of arms of Julie Payette
Crest A musical stave bearing the first notes of the second movement of Alessandro Marcello's Oboe Concerto in D minor Sable; Helm An astronaut helmet Escutcheon Per pale Azure and Sable a wing and in the canton the Royal Crown Argent Supporters Two lynx Sable embellished Argent, each wearing a collar set with laurel leaves Or and mullets Argent, standing on the planet Earth Azure, its atmosphere Argent, charged with the Greek letter sigma (Σ) Argent Motto PER ASPERA AD ASTRA (Through Hardship to the Stars) Orders The ribbon and insignia of the Order of Canada; the ribbon and insignia of the National Order of Quebec

Government offices
Preceded by David Johnston	Governor General of Canada; 2017–2021	Succeeded by Mary Simon
Order of precedence
Preceded by David Johnston as Former Governor General	Order of precedence of Canada; As Former Governor General	Succeeded by Mary Simon as Former Governor General
