= Dollard Senécal =

Canadian Jesuit priest (1912–2002)

Dollard Senécal (1912–2002) was a Canadian Jesuit priest, naturalist, author and educator. He made a major contribution to the education of young people in the natural sciences in Quebec Province and the rest of Canada.

Senécal was born in 1912. He was ordained in 1931.

In 1936, Senécal founded a "circle" of young naturalists that he named after Ignatius of Loyola, He directed his circle for over 18 years. With the help of its members, he organized a natural sciences exhibition that drew the attention of the directors of the Canadian Society of Natural History. From 1950 to 1960, Senécal participated in a program supported by the Department of Public Instruction and taught botany to elementary school teachers so that they could found young naturalist circles (Cercles des Jeunes Naturalistes) within their schools.

Senécal also wrote books and magazines to help the directors of "young naturalists circles" organize activities. He also founded the Club Provincial des Jeunes Naturalistesand its adult counterpart Les Amis de la Nature. Between 1970 and 1976 Senécal published the magazine Le Naturaliste". He has written over 100 "feuillets du Naturaliste" and published the Faune de mon pays and participated to the publication of the Faune de l’arrière-pays He also participated to many local radio and TV shows and translated some literary work related to natural sciences.

Senécal was involved in the following organisations:

- Conseil québécois de l’environnement
- Fédération québécoise du plein air
- Fédération québécoise pour la protection de l’environnement
- Montreal Science Centre
- Communication – Jeunesse organization
- Association des professeurs de sciences du Québec, which he founded
- Fédération Nature Canada
- Société zoologique du Québec
- Société d’astronomie du Québec
- National Science Teachers Association (US)
