= 2020–2021 Rideau Hall workplace review =

Canadian public inquiry

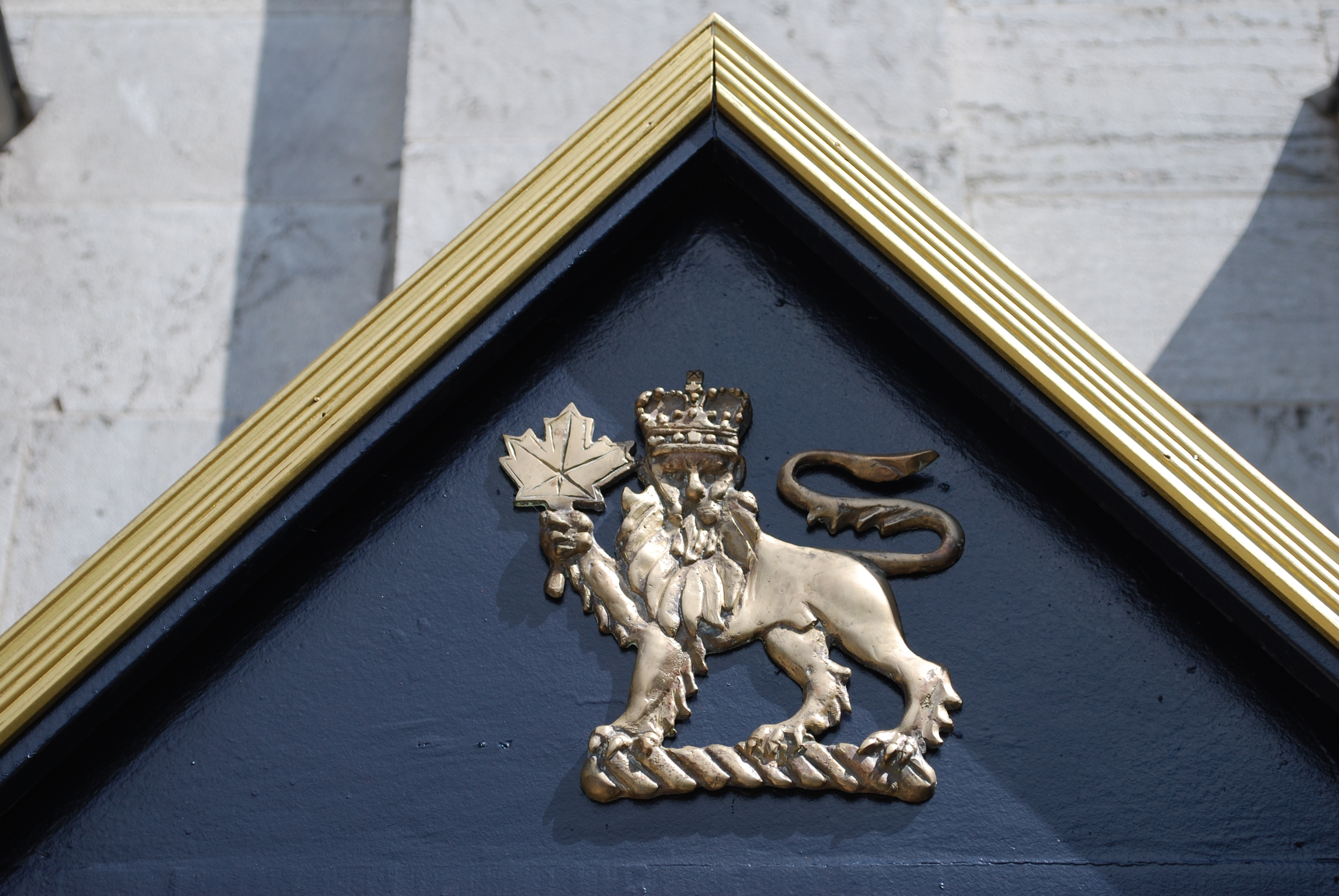
The viceregal badge seen outside of Rideau Hall

The 2020–2021 Rideau Hall workplace review was an external review by Quintet Consulting of the workplace culture at Rideau Hall—which hosts the governor general of Canada and her staff—initiated by the Privy Council Office (PCO) following allegations of harassment and verbal abuse by Governor General Julie Payette and her secretary, Assunta di Lorenzo. The review ultimately produced a report in January 2021 concluding that Payette and Di Lorenzo presided over a toxic work environment, resulting in their resignations on January 21.

== Background ==
=== Appointment of Payette ===
On July 13, 2017, Prime Minister Justin Trudeau announced his recommendation of scientist and former astronaut Julie Payette to succeed David Johnston as the 29th governor general of Canada. Payette was formally appointed by Queen Elizabeth II on October 2, 2017. The role of the governor general is to represent the monarch of Canada when he or she is not in the country and includes granting royal assent to legislation passed by Parliament and dissolving Parliament for an election on the advice of the prime minister.

Trudeau's method of selection for the role was criticized for failing to appropriately vet candidates, as the Advisory Committee on Vice-Regal Appointments, established in 2012, was left dormant following Trudeau's taking office in 2015. Following the 2021 resignations, critics alleged that "when he picked the former astronaut, Mr. Trudeau and his advisers were apparently so enthralled with ticking those symbolic boxes, of installing the candidate who neatly fit the image, that they obviously didn’t do enough to check on who she really was", blaming the government and the Privy Council Office (PCO) for "failing to spot red flags before Payette’s appointment, and then failing to act once the media had highlighted them."

=== Toxic workplace allegations ===
On July 21, 2020, CBC News reported that staff at Rideau Hall, which hosts the office and staff of the governor general, faced harassment and verbal abuse by Payette. Sources detail that early into her tenure, Payette would question staff regarding topics unrelated to what was being discussed at meetings, such as by "put[ting] staff on the spot by quizzing them about outer space". Payette was alleged to also have thrown tantrums in her office, yell at and belittle employees, and refer to their work as "shit". Staffers were seen leaving her office in tears.

Secretary to the Governor General Assunta di Lorenzo, who manages the Office of the Governor General, also was reported to bully staff, calling them lazy and incompetent. The position of secretary is typically filled by a seasoned public servant; however, Di Lorenzo, a lawyer and friend of Payette, was described by staff as not having understood how the public service works two years into her term. The government had to create a new position of associate secretary to assist Di Lorenzo on managing the office.

Rideau Hall's press secretary issued a statement denying the allegations:

“We deeply regret this reporting, which has no basis in the reality of working at the OSGG (Office of the Secretary to the Governor-General), and obscures the important work done by our dedicated staff in honouring, representing, and showcasing Canadians”

==== Reactions ====
When asked about the harassment allegations against Payette on July 24, Conservative leader Andrew Scheer declined to comment, but said he hoped there would be a “comprehensive” look at other allegations in the Prime Minister's Office (PMO). New Democratic Party (NDP) leader Jagmeet Singh commented that "I think the first step would be to follow up on complaints and then there could be a thorough investigation of these. And if there were enough evidence to warrant suspending the Governor General from her duties, then that would be assessed at that point".

==== Rideau Hall response ====
After the story broke, Rideau Hall's press secretary said her office "strongly believes in the importance of a healthy workplace, we have taken many steps to foster this, we will continue to do so and will work at constantly improving," and called for a review. CBC News reported on August 12 that the Office of the Governor General was bringing in psychologists specializing in workplace stress to speak to employees, and Payette released a memo on July 31 telling staff that she was listening to concerns and urging them to "stay united":

"Rest assured that I take workplace harassment very seriously and fully support the review of our practices and the continuation of concrete actions to ensure a healthy and safe work environment for everyone, at all times and in all circumstances".

=== Investigation ===
In response to the allegations, the PCO announced on September 1 that it would retain Quintet Consulting, an Ottawa-based consulting firm, to launch an independent, third-party review of the workplace culture at Rideau Hall. Current and previous employees were invited to be voluntarily interviewed about their experiences at Rideau Hall. The PCO's independent report found that Payette and Di Lorenzo presided over a toxic work environment, detailing “yelling, screaming, aggressive conduct, demeaning comments and public humiliations.”

During the investigation, CBC News reported that the Prime Minister's Office failed to conduct checks with Payette's previous employers prior to her appointment as Governor General. Sources who previously worked with Payette at the Canadian Space Agency, the Montreal Science Centre, the Canadian Olympic Committee and the Canada Lands Company described similar experiences working as the complainants at Rideau Hall, as well as previous departures from the Montreal Science Centre in 2016 and Canadian Olympic Committee in 2017 following complaints and investigations into similar matters.

== Resignations of Payette and di Lorenzo ==
On January 21, 2021, Payette and Di Lorenzo resigned from their roles following the conclusion of the PCO report and a meeting the previous evening with Prime Minister Trudeau and President of the Privy Council Dominic LeBlanc. Had Payette declined to resign, her dismissal could have triggered a constitutional crisis involving intervention by the Queen.

The Governor General's Office released a statement following her resignation which included an apology by Payette:

"Everyone has a right to a healthy and safe work environment, at all times and under all circumstances. It appears this was not always the case at the Office of the Secretary to the Governor General. Tensions have arisen at Rideau Hall over the past few months and for that, I am sorry."

Richard Wagner, the chief justice of Canada, assumed the role of administrator of Canada in the interim and acted as Governor General until the appointment of Mary Simon in July.

=== Reactions ===
Prime Minister Trudeau stated: "Every employee in the government of Canada has the right to work in a safe and healthy environment, and we will always take this very seriously. Today's announcement provides an opportunity for new leadership at Rideau Hall to address the workplace concerns raised by employees during the review."

Conservative leader Erin O'Toole cited problems with Trudeau's selection of Payette, accusing him of not vetting properly and called on him to meet with party leaders to discuss selecting the next governor general, stating: "[c]onsidering the problems with his last appointment and the minority Parliament, the Prime Minister should consult opposition parties and re-establish the Vice-Regal Appointments Committee."

NDP leader Jagmeet Singh stated: "The people we need to keep in mind here are the workers that had to endure an unsafe work environment. It takes more than the Governor General resigning. The prime minister must take the necessary measures that ensure the health and safety of workers and a harassment-free work environment."
