= Janet Rosenberg (landscape architect) =

Canadian landscape architect & urban designer (born 1951)

Janet Rosenberg FCSLA, FASLA, RCA
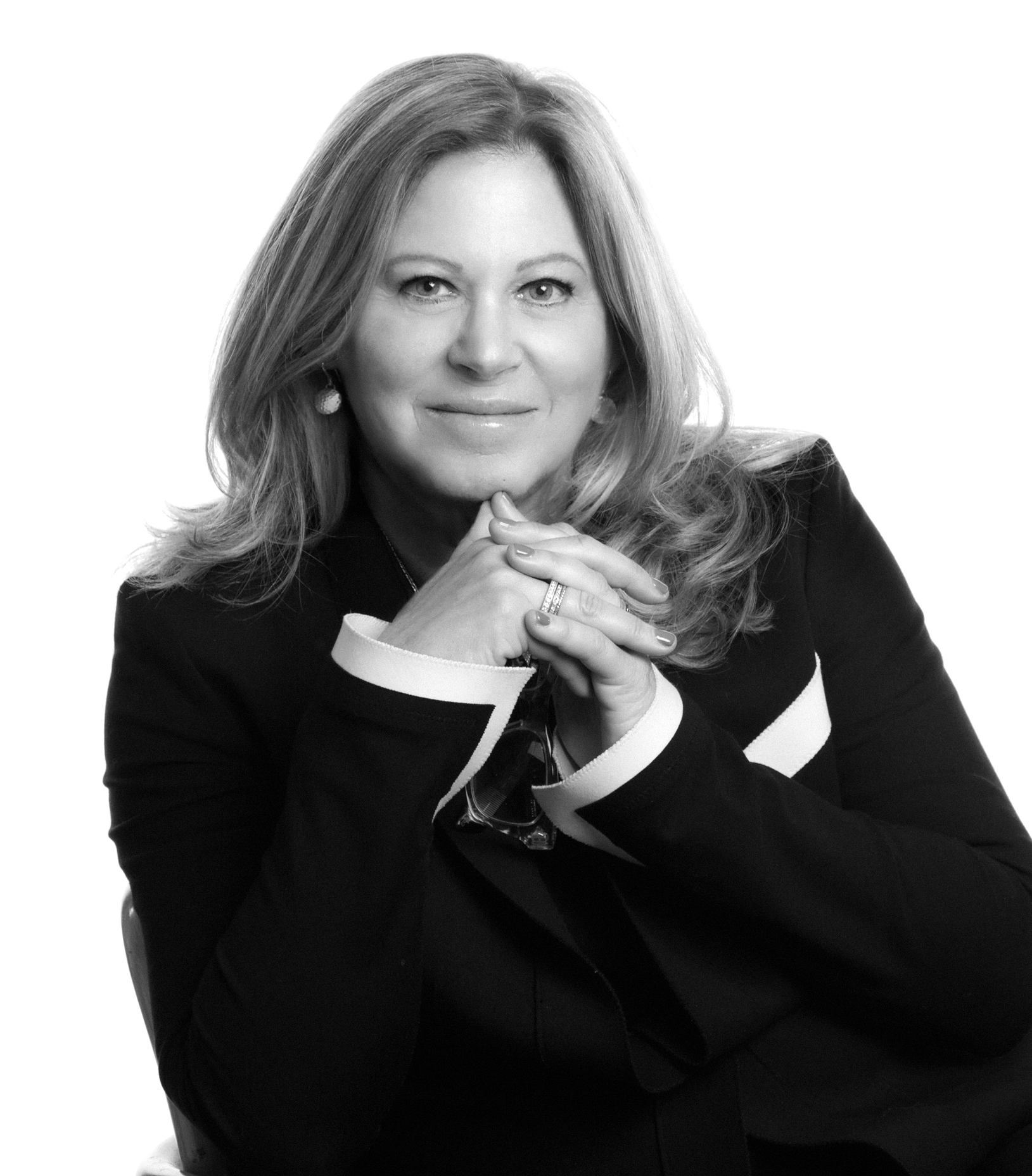
- Janet Rosenberg in 2019
- Born: Toronto, Ontario
- Occupation: Landscape Architect
- Awards: 1992 Governor General of Canada Confederation Medal; 2003 OALA Pinnacle Award for Landscape Architectural Excellence; 2024 CSLA Lifetime Achievement Award
- Practice: Janet Rosenberg & Studio (JRS)
- Website: jrstudio.ca

Janet Rosenberg, FCSLA, FASLA, RCA, is a Canadian landscape architect based in Toronto, Ontario, Canada, and the founding principal of Janet Rosenberg & Studio (JRS).

== Awards ==
Rosenberg was awarded the 1992 Governor General of Canada Confederation Medal, the 2003 OALA’s Pinnacle Award for Landscape Architectural Excellence, the 2008 Urban Leadership Award from the Canadian Urban Institute, and the 2024 CSLA Lifetime Achievement Award.

Rosenberg is a fellow of the Canadian Society of Landscape Architects and the American Society of Landscape Architects.

== Notable projects ==
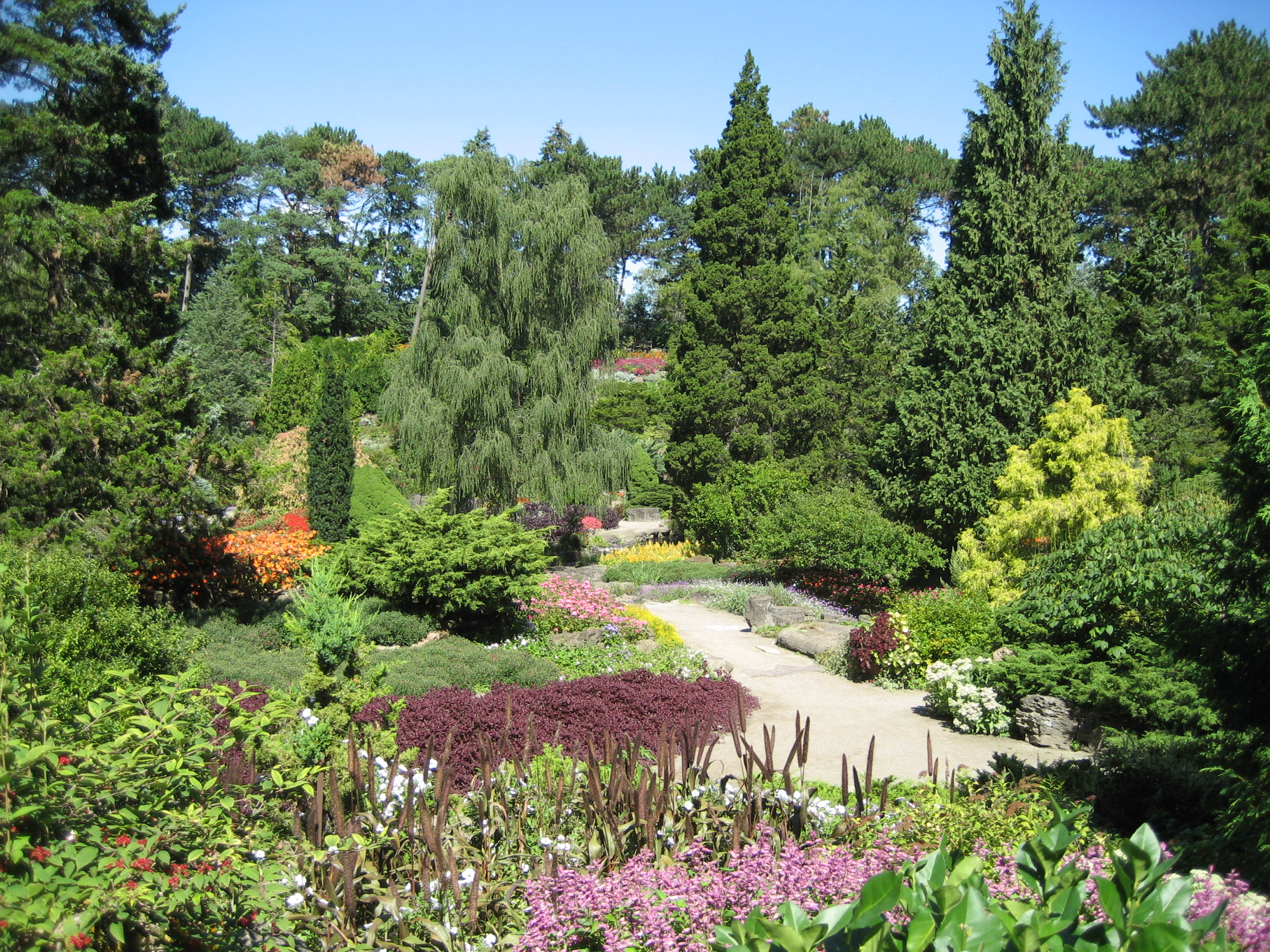
Rock Garden at the Royal Botanical Gardens (Ontario)

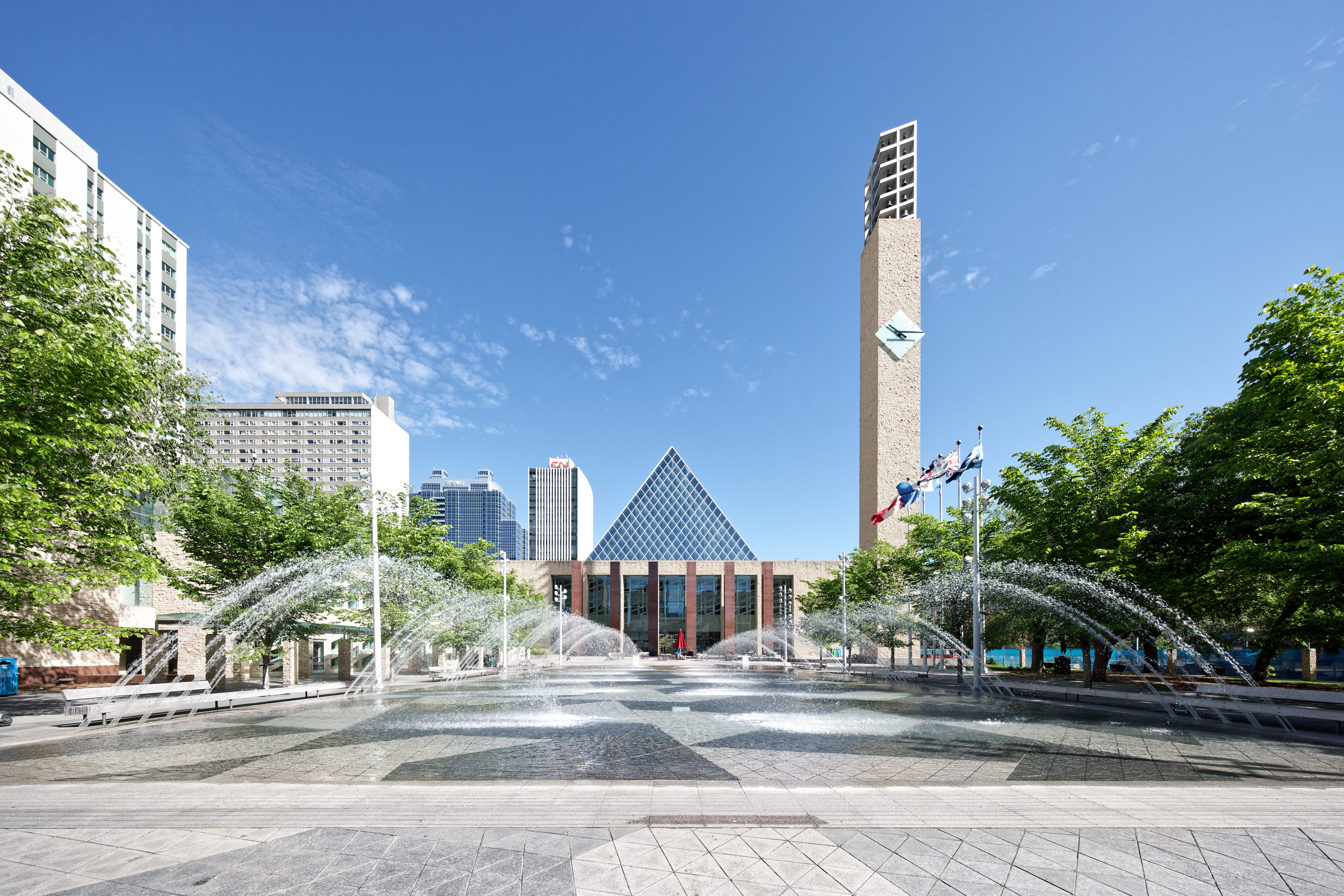
Edmonton City Hall and Memorial Fountain

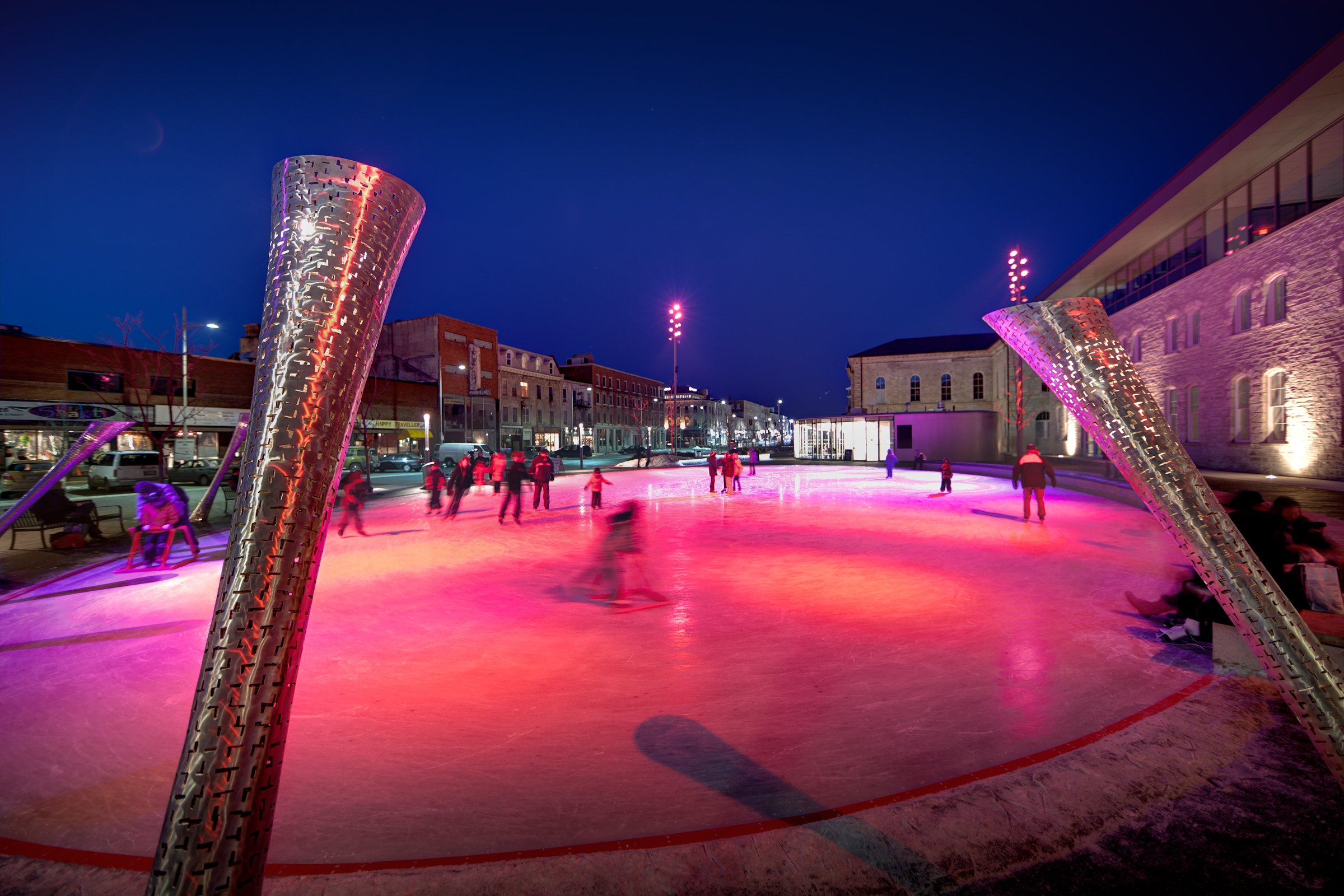
Guelph Market Square in winter

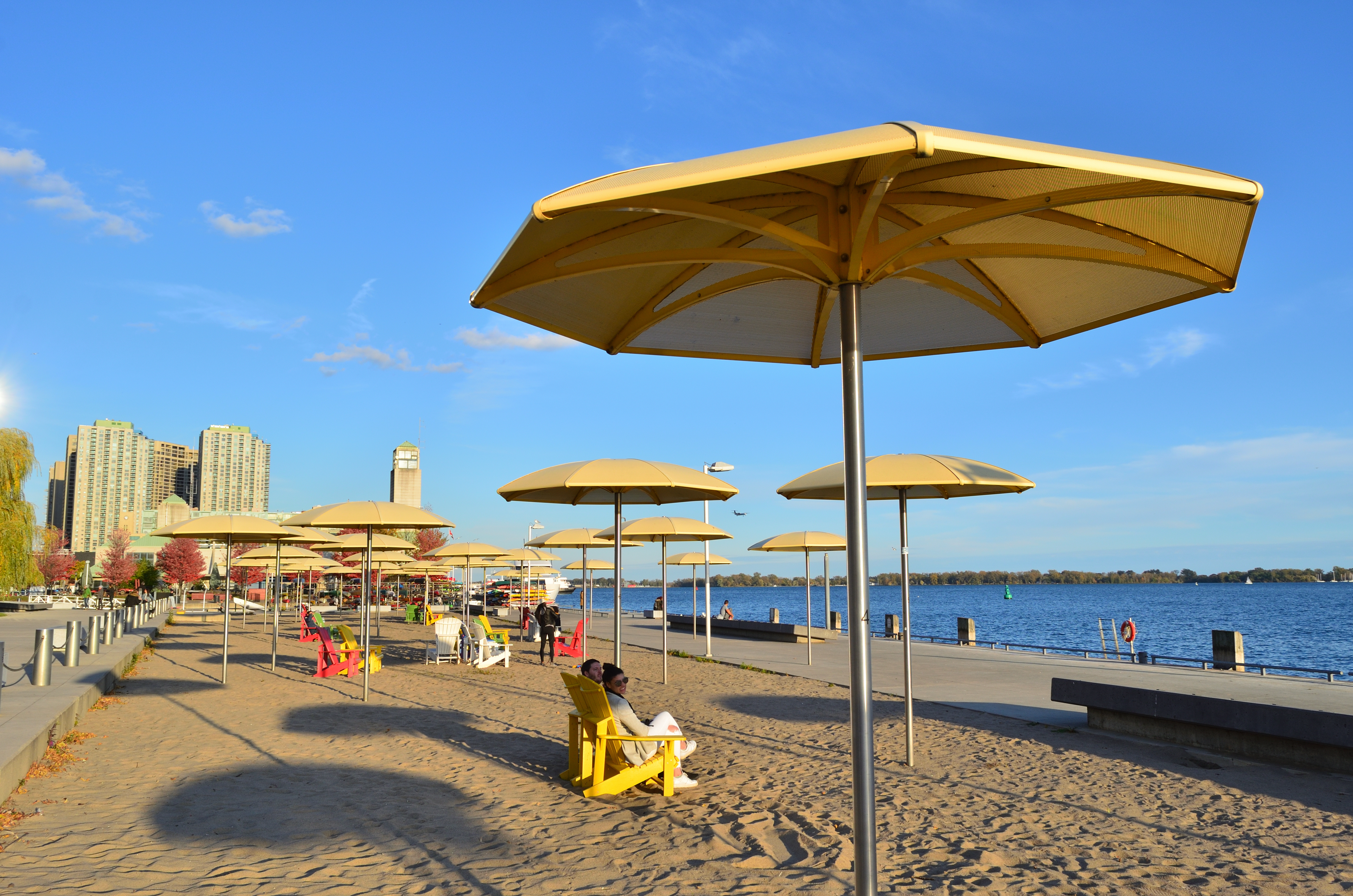
HTO Park, Toronto

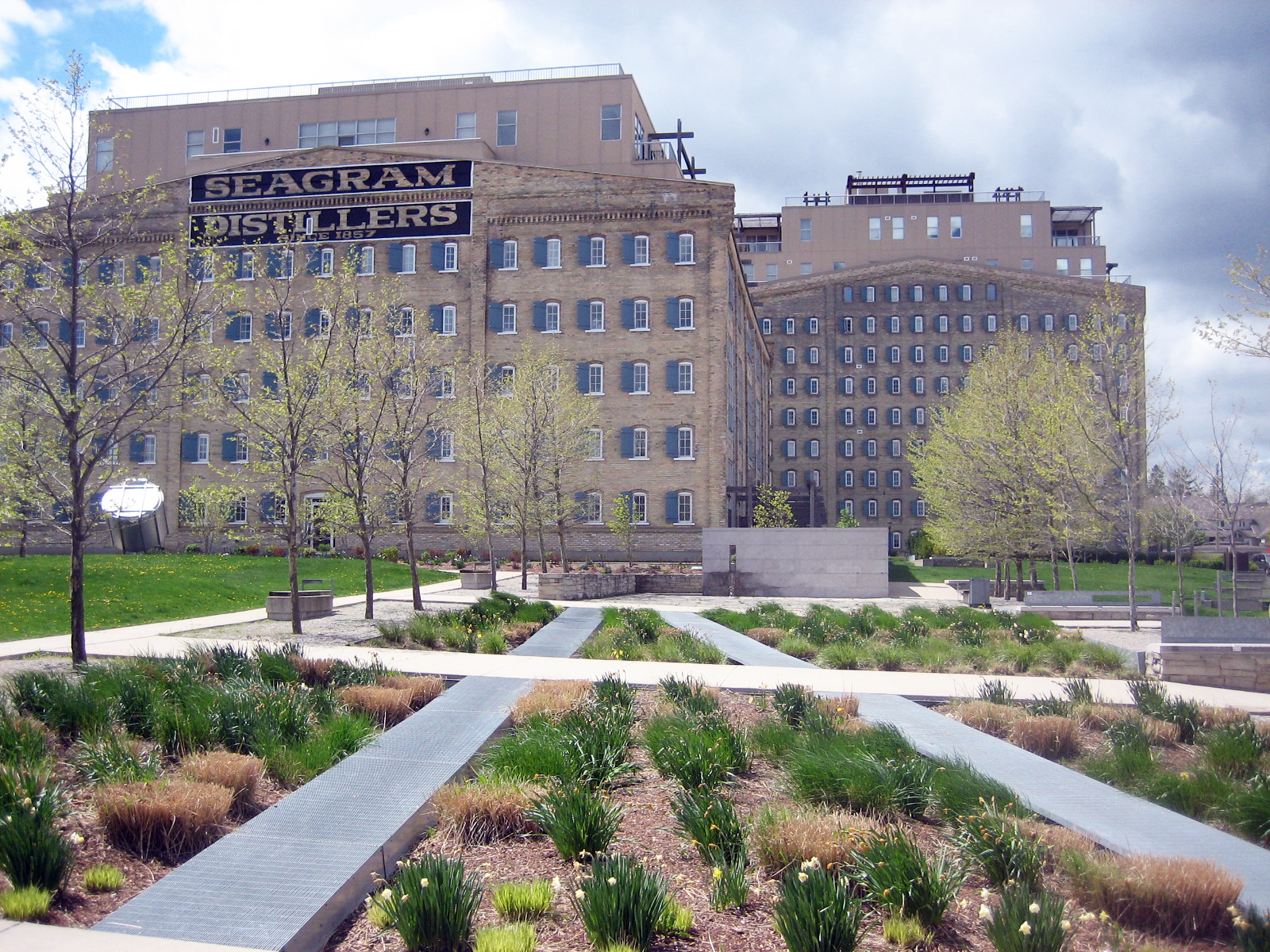
Kitchener Barrel Warehouse Park and Seagram Lofts (Father David Bauer Drive) Parc Barrel Warehouse et Seagram Lofts, Kitchener (Father David Bauer Drive) (19892453693)

Notable Janet Rosenberg & Studio (JRS) landscape projects include:

- Kìwekì Point (formerly Nepean Point) (Ottawa, 2025)
- Alberta Legislature Grounds Revitalization (Edmonton, 2024)
- University Commons, University of Alberta (Edmonton, 2022)
- Yorkville Plaza (Toronto, 2022)
- Howard Street Parkette (Toronto, 2022)
- The Royal Hotel (Picton, Prince Edward County, Ontario, 2022)
- Edmonton Civic Precinct (Edmonton, 2021)
- James Canning Gardens (Toronto, 2021)
- U of T Student Commons (Toronto, 2021)
- Senator Marian Maloney Park (Etobicoke, 2019)
- Aquavista (Toronto, 2019)
- Montgomery Square (Toronto, 2019)
- Alexandra Park Community Revitalization (Toronto, 2017–)
- Victoria Park Revitalization (Kingston, 2017)
- David Braley & Nancy Gordon Rock Garden at Royal Botanical Gardens (Burlington/Hamilton, 2016)
- Pioneer Village and Finch West TTC stations (Toronto, 2017)
- Women’s College Hospital Redevelopment (Toronto, 2016)
- Mirvish Village/Honest Ed’s (Toronto, 2015–)
- The Plaza at The Pinnacle on Adelaide (Toronto, 2015)
- Fort York’s Visitor Centre (Toronto, 2014)
- Toronto Pan Am Sports Centre (Scarborough, 2014)
- Max Tanenbaum Healing Garden, Princess Margaret Cancer Centre (Toronto, 2014)
- Richard Ivey School of Business, Western University (London, 2013)
- Guelph Civic Centre Market Square (Guelph, 2012)
- Jamie Bell Adventure Playground, High Park (Toronto, 2012)
- Devonian Gardens (Calgary, 2012)
- Joel Weeks Park (Toronto, 2012)
- Richmond-Adelaide Centre (Toronto, 2011)
- Riverwalk Commons (Newmarket, 2011)
- Mississauga Celebration Square (Mississauga, 2011)
- Martin Goodman Trail (Toronto, 2009)
- HTO Park (Toronto, 2007)
- Town Hall Square (Toronto, 2005)
- Franklin Children’s Garden (Centre Island, Toronto, 2005)
- TD Centre Plaza Revitalization (Toronto, 2005)
- Welland Canal Park & Civic Square (Welland, 2005)
- Schulich School of Business, York University (Toronto, 2004)
- 30 Adelaide Street East (Toronto, 2002)
- Barrel Warehouse Park (Waterloo, 2001)
- Jackson Triggs Estate Winery (Niagara-on-the-Lake, 2001)
- Courthouse Square (Toronto, 1995)
- York University Common (Toronto, 1992)

Rosenberg, together with Ghanaian-British architect David Adjaye and Israeli designer and artist Ron Arad, was one of the six design teams shortlisted for the Canadian Holocaust Monument international design competition in 2014.
