= HTO Park =

Public beach in Toronto, Canada

H_{T}O Park
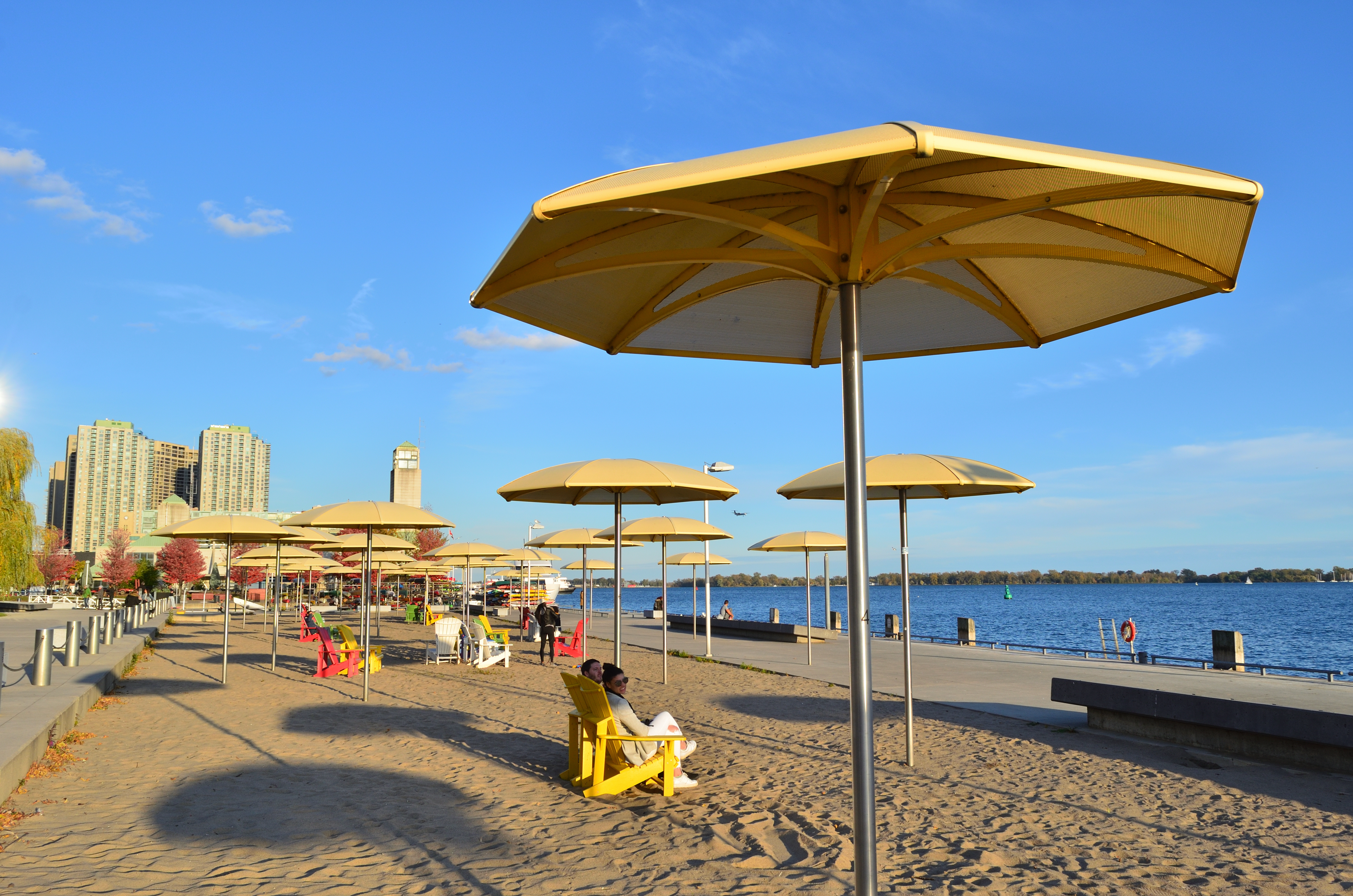
- H_{T}O in June 2019

- Location within Toronto
- Type: Urban beach
- Location: Toronto, Ontario
- Coordinates: 43°38′15″N 79°23′17″W
- Area: 22,993 square metres (247,500 sq ft)
- Created: 2007
- Operator: City of Toronto

HTO Park (stylized as H_{T}O) is an urban beach in Toronto, Ontario, Canada, that opened in 2007. It is located west of Harbourfront Centre, on Lake Ontario.

== History ==
The park is built on quays once used by ships berthing in Toronto's Inner Harbour.

The park consists of two sections:

- H_{T}O Park West is built on the eastern half of Maple Leaf Quay
- H_{T}O Park East is built on the old Peter Street Slip

The two quays are concrete man-made infill during the 1920s with the project completed by 1929. The eastern portion was home to Maple Leaf Mills Silos until 1983. The western half was home to a smaller industrial business with a small office structure. During the 1980s, a condo project (now known as Harbour Terrace) was built on part of Maple Leaf Quay while the rest stood empty as a parking lot. The eastern portion lay empty in the 1980s and 1990s.

== Name ==
H_{T}O is a play on H_{2}O, the chemical formula for water, since "TO" is commonly used to refer to Toronto and it is a waterfront park.

== Design ==
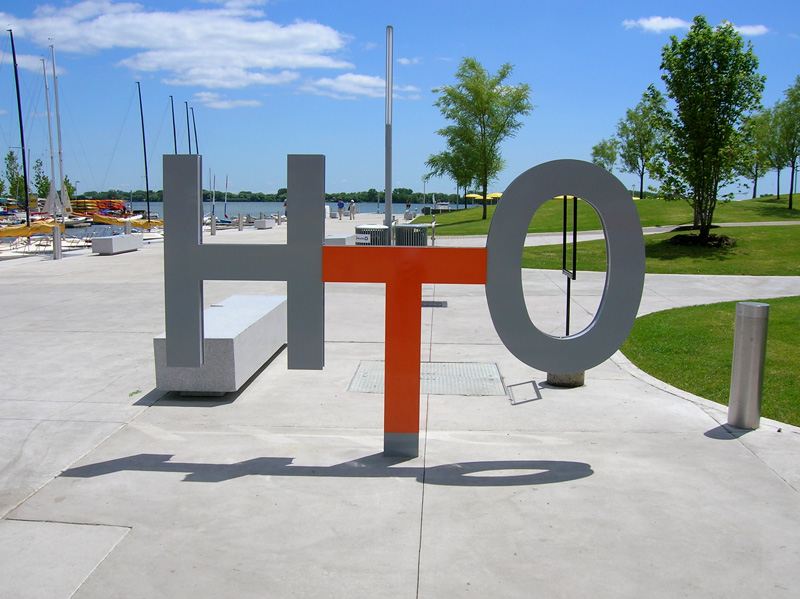
H_{T}O Park entrance

H_{T}O Park was designed by landscape architecture firm Janet Rosenberg & Studio, Claude Cormier Architectes Paysagistes Inc. and Hariri Pontarini Architects. The park incorporates elements of a park, beach, and golf course. The park's standout feature is a sandpit that holds Muskoka chairs and enormous fixed yellow metal umbrellas. The umbrellas were designed to evoke the Georges Seurat painting A Sunday Afternoon on the Island of La Grande Jatte. At night, the park knolls are illuminated by LED lights.

In 2016, HTO Park was included in The Landscape Performance Series Case Study Briefs, a database of over 200 exemplary built projects with quantified environmental, economic and social benefits.

== Area ==
H_{T}O Park East is also home to the Toronto Fire Services Station (Marine Unit) 334 (built 2000), Toronto EMS Station 36.

== See also ==
- List of Toronto parks
- Other beaches and waterfront parks:
  - Cherry Beach
  - Sugar Beach
  - The Beaches
