= Montreal Clock Tower =

Clock tower in Canada

- French: Tour de l'Horloge de Montréal
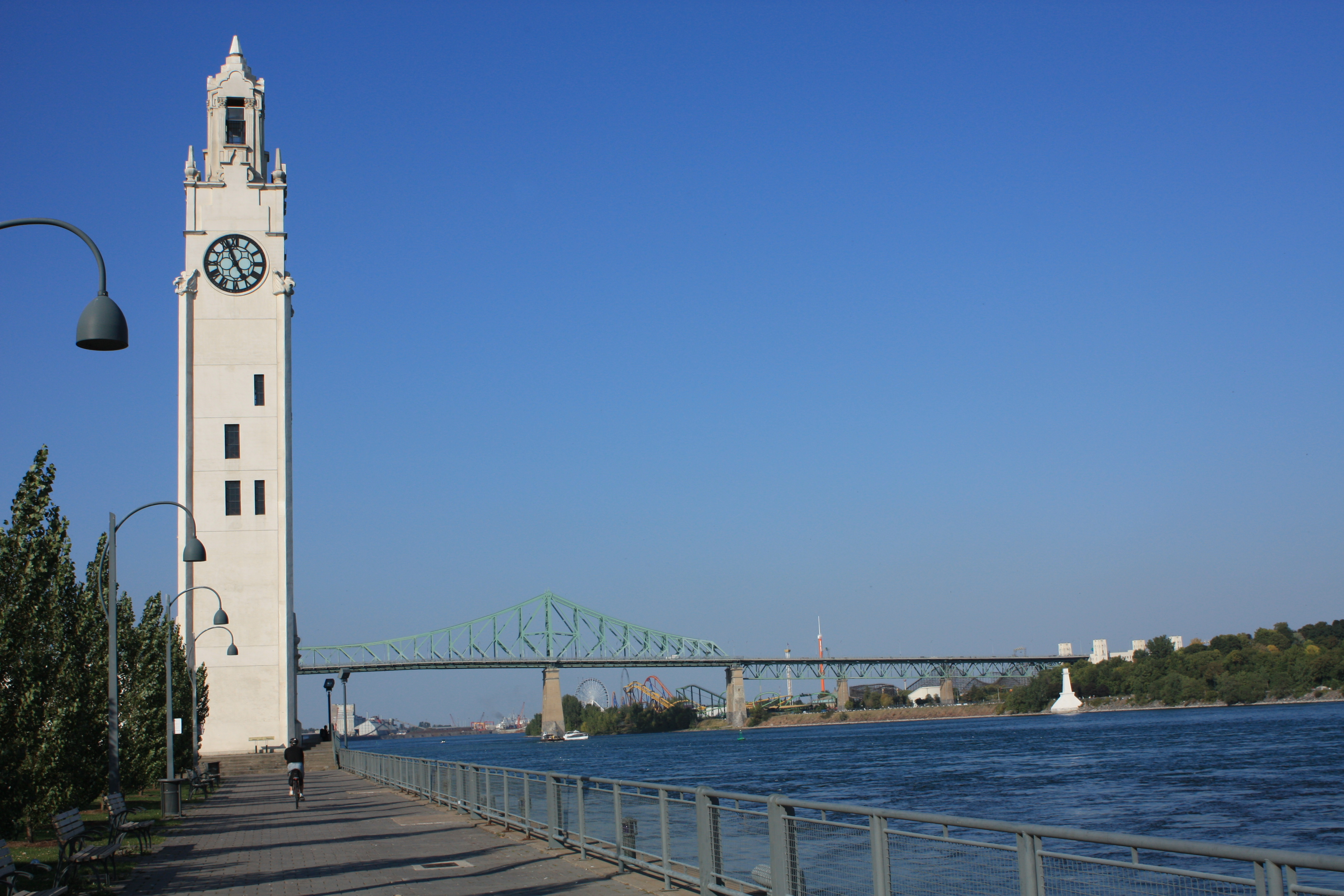
- The tower and Jacques Cartier Bridge
- Interactive map of Montreal Clock Tower
- Location: Old Port of Montreal
- Coordinates: 45°30′44.44″N 073°32′44.84″W
- Height: 45 m (148 ft)
- Beginning date: October 31, 1919
- Completion date: 1922
- Dedicated to: Canadian sailors who died in World War I

Audio of the clock mechanism (with the hum of air conditioning in the background) recorded August 2017

The Montreal Clock Tower (French: Tour de l'Horloge de Montréal), also known as the Sailor's Memorial Clock, is located in the borough of Ville-Marie and is situated in the Old Port of Montreal. The construction of the tower began in 1919, and was finished in 1922. The Clock Tower is 45 m (148 ft) tall with 192 steps from the bottom to the top of the tower. It has three observation stops along the staircase and the outside walls of the Clock Tower are white in colour. The structure consists of the principal tower as well as a smaller tower that is 12 m (39 ft) and architecturally similar to the main tower. The two towers are connected by a white 13 m (42 ft) curtain wall. The tower consists of four translucent clock faces. These are each 3.7 m (12 ft) in diameter and were designed by the English engineering firm Gillett & Johnston.

The building of the Montreal clock tower was directed by the Montreal Harbor Commission. The commission was formed in the year 1830 to oversee the infrastructural development of the Old Port of Montreal and was replaced by the National Harbours Board in 1936. The tower marks the entrance to the Old Port of Montreal and its erection was dedicated to the seamen who died in the First World War. It is a symbol of the port's economic contribution through grain exportation to the city of Montreal during the era of the Clock Tower's construction.

== History ==
Construction of the Montreal Clock Tower took three years, beginning in 1919 and ending in 1922. In 1919, Edward, who was then Prince of Wales, began the construction by laying the first piece for the foundation of the Clock Tower. The grain sheds previously concealed by the curtain wall connecting the main clock tower and the smaller tower were removed in the 1970s. The actual Clock Tower structure was designed by Montreal engineer, Paul Leclaire. The mechanism in the clock tower was designed by the English engineering firm, Gillett & Johnson, who used a similar design to the Big Ben. Originally called Gillett & Bland, the firm Gillett & Johnson have designed and constructed more than 14,000 clock mechanisms in their Croydon, England factory. The mechanism for the Montreal Clock Tower was one of these. The clock faces are operated by 4 interlocking gears that move each individual clock in unison.

The owner of the tower is the Old Port Society, which was developed to manage tourism within the area. The Old Port Society made the Clock Tower a tourist interpretation centre in 1980. In 1984, the Old Port Society restored the Clock Tower, costing $2.5 million. The restoration included painting the steel surfaces and installing a new ventilation system.

== Heritage Value ==
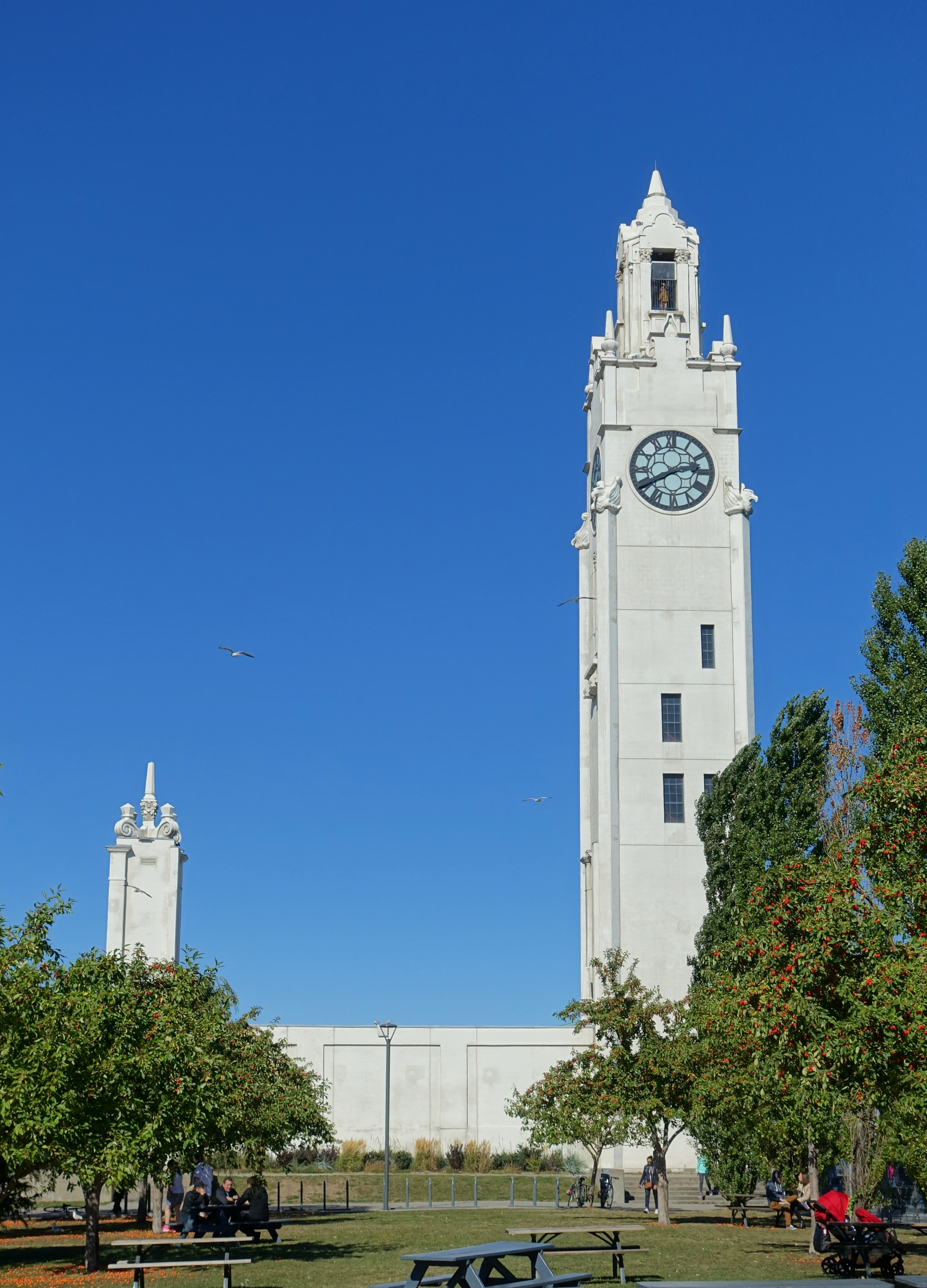
Southern viewpoint of the Montreal Clock Tower

=== Environmental ===
The Montreal Clock Tower was announced as a Classified Federal Heritage Building as determined by the Federal Heritage Buildings Review Office (FHBRO) in 1996, due to its visual aesthetics as well as its historical and environmental values. The custodian for the tower is the Public Works and Government Services Canada. The FHBRO considers the Clock Tower to be environmentally valuable and an important Montreal landmark as it was a central point for the redevelopment of the Old Port of Montreal in 1990. This redevelopment was directed by award-winning architects from the firm, Cardinal Hardy and Associates. The tower is situated opposite Clock Tower Beach (French: Plage de l'Horloge de Montréal). The beach is swim-free and takes up 1.3 ha (3.2 acres) of land.

=== Historical ===
The FHBRO determined the Montreal Clock Tower to be historically valuable due to its association with the role of the Old Port of Montreal in maritime transportation and grain exportation. The role of the Old Port in relation to grain exportation and cargo was classified as second in North America during the Clock Tower's construction. The Port's exportation made it a large contributor to the economic growth of Montreal as a city. New trees now grow where the grain sheds used for the storage of exporting goods once were. In relation to maritime transportation, the Old Port of Montreal was used as an exit and entry point for seamen during the First World War. The construction of the Clock Tower was dedicated to lost seamen during the First World War.

=== Architectural ===
The FHBRO considers the Montreal Clock Tower to be architecturally aesthetic due to its Beaux-Arts style. This style of architecture is defined as an expression of nature's beauty through a method of fine art and detail. The FHBRO notes that the Clock Tower's shape and decorative features adhere to the Beaux-Arts style and are also practical. The Clock Tower was constructed through a method of light masonry, by which the entire infrastructure is constructed as individual sections, and then joined at the end. This included separated building of the main clock tower, the smaller tower and the conjoining curtain wall. This building process made the Clock Tower light in weight and high in the quality of material used, allowing it to be supported by the wharf that it was built on without fault.

The Clock Tower is made of concrete and is built on a square base, with each supporting corner at a different height on the ground. The stem of the tower consists of the entrance on the east facing side and signs of an old entrance on the south side, which was formally hidden by the grain sheds. The north facing side has a memorial plaque to the sailors who died during the First World War. The western facing side of the Clock Tower has rectangular columns reaching from the base. The FHBRO considers the sailor's memorial plaque, the granite placed by the Prince of Wales and the cannons featured at the entrance of the Clock Tower to be key architectural elements to be maintained.

The upper portion of the tower features four clock faces, with columns and rectangular openings below the northern, eastern and western facing clocks. The southern face features rectangular openings in no particular pattern. Further below these, the Clock Tower has smooth concrete walls that extend to the base. Each corner of the concrete walls features a rectangular pillar with an eagle on top. Central to the upper portion of the Clock Tower is an observation deck. The smaller tower features corner pilasters and is linked to the main tower by the concrete curtain wall.

== Maintenance ==
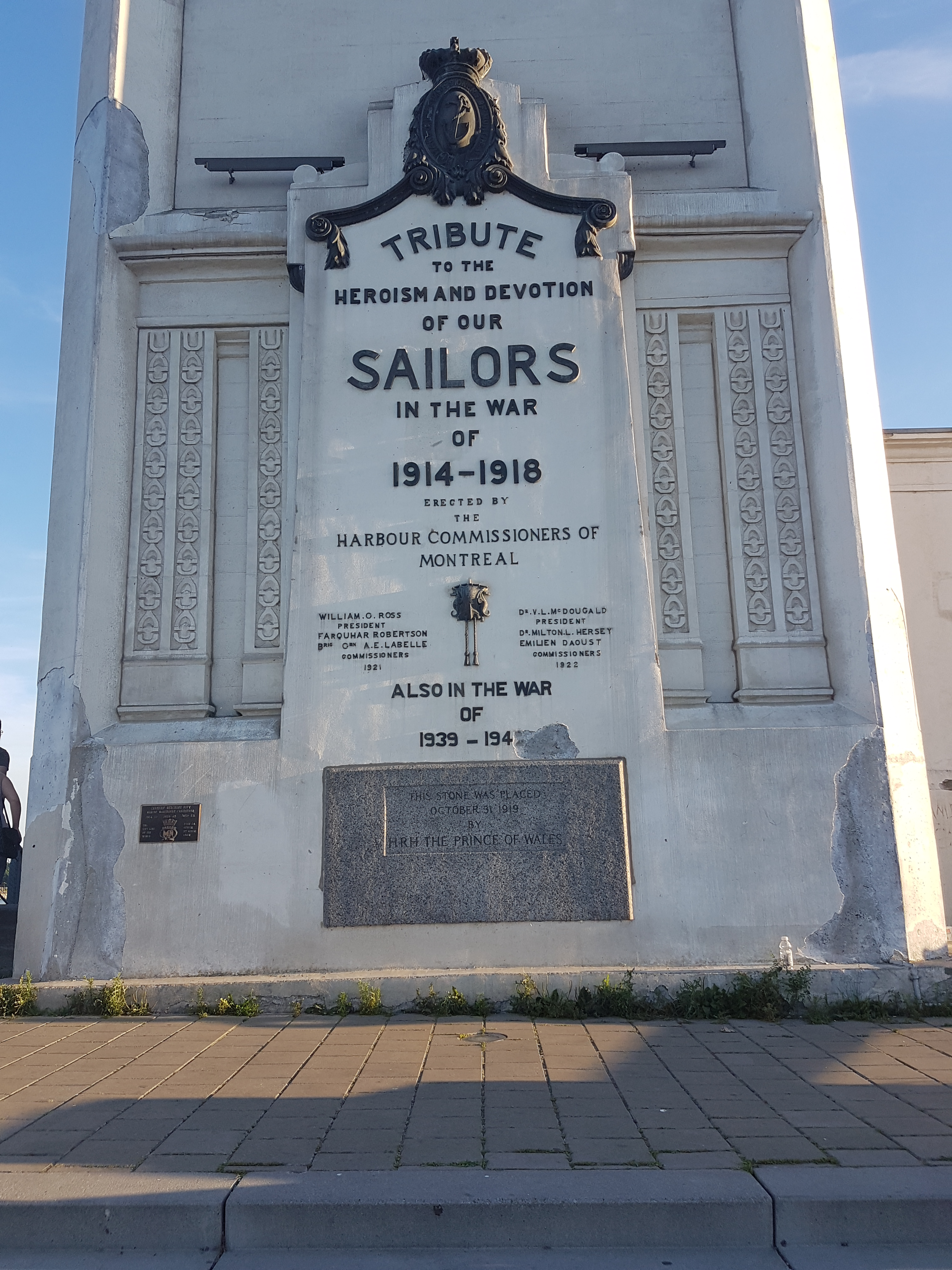
Sailors' tribute at the northern base of the Clock Tower.

The Montreal Clock Tower has a strict maintenance and repair schedule in order to preserve the life of the clock mechanism and ensure that the time displayed is accurate. Currently, professional clockmaker, Daniel Pelletier is responsible for the maintenance of the Clock Tower's mechanism, as well as the continuous adjustment of the time displayed on each of the four clock faces. Pelletier began working on the Clock Tower in 1986, when the mechanism broke down. In the spring and autumn of each year, Pelletier manually adjusts the time displayed the Clock Towers by moving the gears that move the hands on each clock in order to align with daylight saving time. The pendulum that motions the clock mechanism requires constant maintenance as it breaks more than five times a year.

The mechanism and gears within the Montreal Clock Tower structure require ongoing maintenance due to the high temperatures in Montreal during summer and well as the cold climate during the winter months. Due to the high amount of human contact with the Clock Tower and its mechanism, tourism creates a buildup of dust and particles, creating a larger need for ongoing maintenance. The Federal Heritage Buildings Review Office concludes that constant and technical observation of the clock mechanism, as well as the inspection of the lights behind each clock face is essential to preserve the heritage of the landmark.

The FHBRO notes that the exterior of the Clock Tower also requires constant maintenance in order to preserve the architecturally aesthetic qualities of the landmark. The FHBRO concludes that this process should include up keeping the trees behind the curtain wall, painting the exterior walls and the preservation of the memorial plaque on the northern facing side. In 2002, the Old Port of Montreal undertook major maintenance to the Clock Tower and installed a ventilation system and painted exposed steel surfaces. Major restoration on the Clock Tower also took place in 1984.

== Tourism ==
In 1984, the Montreal Clock Tower was converted into a tourist interpretation centre following a restoration of the landmark. The Old Port Corporation manages tourism for the Old Port of Montreal.

National and international tourism awards won by the Old Port Corporation:
Year	Award	Description
2006	Zagat-Survey	First Prize most popular tourist destination in Montreal
2005	Grand Prix du Tourisme Quebecois	Tourism worker of the year, Montreal region Chantale Moisan
2000	Provincial Winner	Attraction Canada Old Port of Montreal

== See also ==
- Halifax Town Clock – a clock tower in Halifax, Nova Scotia
- Soldiers' Tower – a bell and clock tower in Toronto, Ontario
