= Old Port of Montreal =

Coordinates: 45°30′18″N 73°33′09″W

Old Port of Montreal Vieux-Port de Montréal (French)
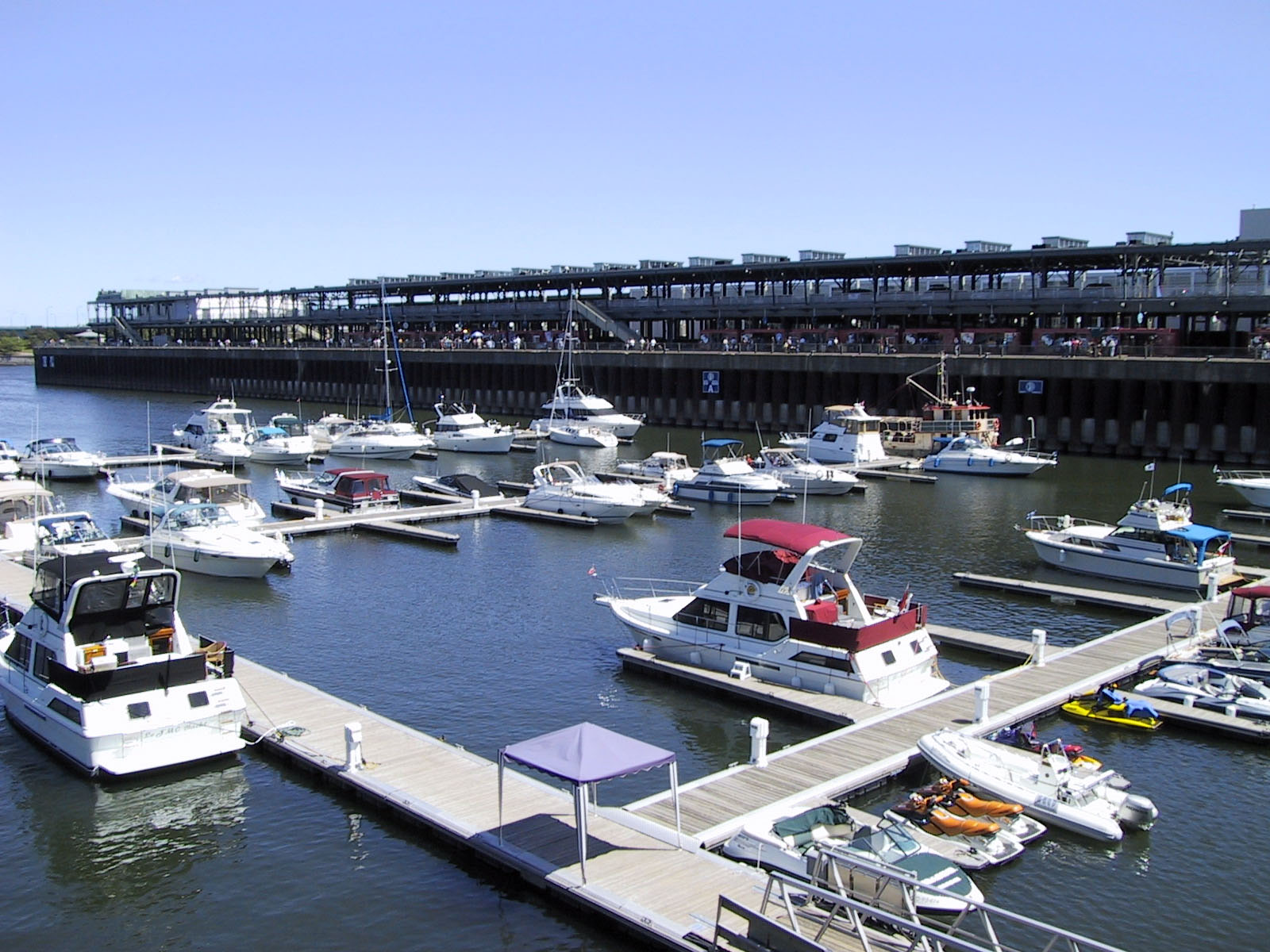
- The Old Port of Montreal
- Interactive map of Old Port of Montreal; Vieux-Port de Montréal (French)

Location
- Country: Canada
- Location: Montreal, Quebec

Details
- Opened: 1830
- Operated by: Old Port of Montreal Corporation, Canada Lands Company

Statistics
- Website http://www.oldportofmontreal.com/

The Old Port of Montreal (French: Vieux-Port de Montréal) is the historic port of Montreal, Quebec, Canada. Located adjacent to Old Montreal, it stretches for over 2 km (1.2 mi) along the Saint Lawrence River. It was used as early as 1611, when French fur traders used it as a trading post.

In 1976, Montreal's Port activities were moved east to the present Port of Montreal in the borough of Mercier–Hochelaga-Maisonneuve.

The Old Port was redeveloped in the early 1990s, under the direction of architects Aurèle Cardinal and Peter Rose. It is today a recreational and historical area and draws six million tourists annually.

== Attractions ==
The historical Old Port offers Montrealers and visitors alike access to a wide variety of activities, including the Montréal Science Centre, with an IMAX Theatre, and the Montreal Clock Tower. It offers riverfront access for walking, cycling, roller-blading, quadricycle, pedalo and Segway rentals. It is also located at the eastern end of the Lachine Canal, which has itself been extensively refurbished as a popular destination for cycling, roller-blading and pleasure boating. Cultural events include the Festival Montréal en lumière, Igloofest and the Matsuri Japon festival.

In June 2012, an urban beach, called the Plage de l'Horloge (Clock Tower Beach), opened adjacent to the Clock Tower.

The Old Port of Montreal changed its name to The Quays of the Old Port of Montreal in 2005. Approximately every two years the Cirque du Soleil launches a new show from the Jacques Cartier Quay.

The Old Port was rejected as the site of a proposed aerial gondola.

The Old Port was also known as one of the most famous fishing spots in the greater Montreal area. A popular shore fishing position is Parc de la Cité-du-Havre, which provides a fishing spot with a wide range of fish species. In the winter, ice fishing events were held on the ice inside the old port.

The Grande roue de Montréal Ferris Wheel opened in 2017 at the Old Port. It is the tallest ferris wheel in Canada.

== Management ==
The Old Port is managed by the Old Port of Montreal Corporation, a subsidiary of Canada Lands Company. The Old Port of Montreal reports directly to Canada Lands Company.

== See also ==
- Old Port of Montreal–Longueuil Ferry
