= Brother Adrien Rivard =

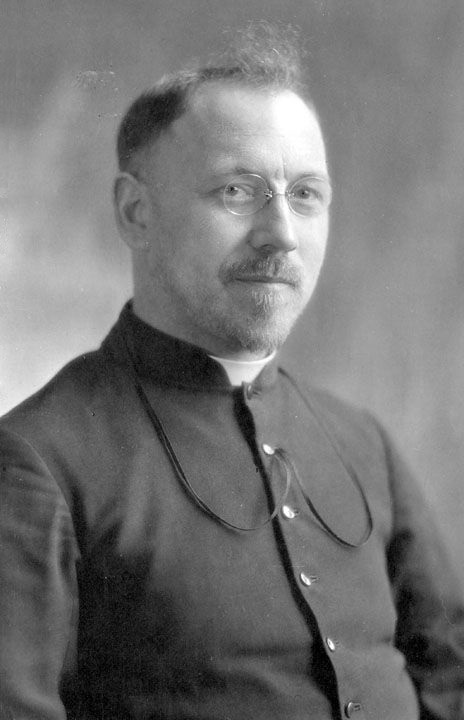
Adrien Rivard, 1933

Brother Adrien Rivard (1890–1969) was a Canadian botanist.

== Biography ==
Brother Adrien Rivard was born in Sainte-Geneviève de Pierrefonds on August 29, 1890. At the age of twelve, he entered a Sainte-Croix institution in Côte-des-Neiges (Montreal). Four years later, in 1906, he entered another Sainte-Croix institution in Sainte-Geneviève and completed his noviciate. He then adopted the name of Brother Adrien. During his first years as a priest, he spent a lot of time studying languages (English and Spanish) and reading French literature. In 1923 he started teaching at Beaudet in Ville Saint-Laurent. In 1925 he founded an Audubon Junior club within the school. He later transformed the concept of the Audubon Junior club into a sort of Natural Sciences teaching formula and approached Brother Marie-Victorin from the Canadian Society of Natural History in order to carry out his project. Brother Marie-Victorin was very enthusiastic about his idea and together they created what would officially become (in 1931) the Cercles des Jeunes Naturalistes. When the CJN were created, Brother Adrien quit his teaching job to become the director of his new organization. He spent a lot of time on the road offering lectures and organizing events related to the CJN. Brother Adrien was also involved in activities related to photography, landscaping and ornithology. He was forced to abandon the CJN in the early 1960s because of health problems. He died on November 12, 1969, at the age of 79.
