= Clock Tower Beach =

Urban beach in the Old Port of Montreal

Clock Tower Beach Plage de l'Horloge
- Beach
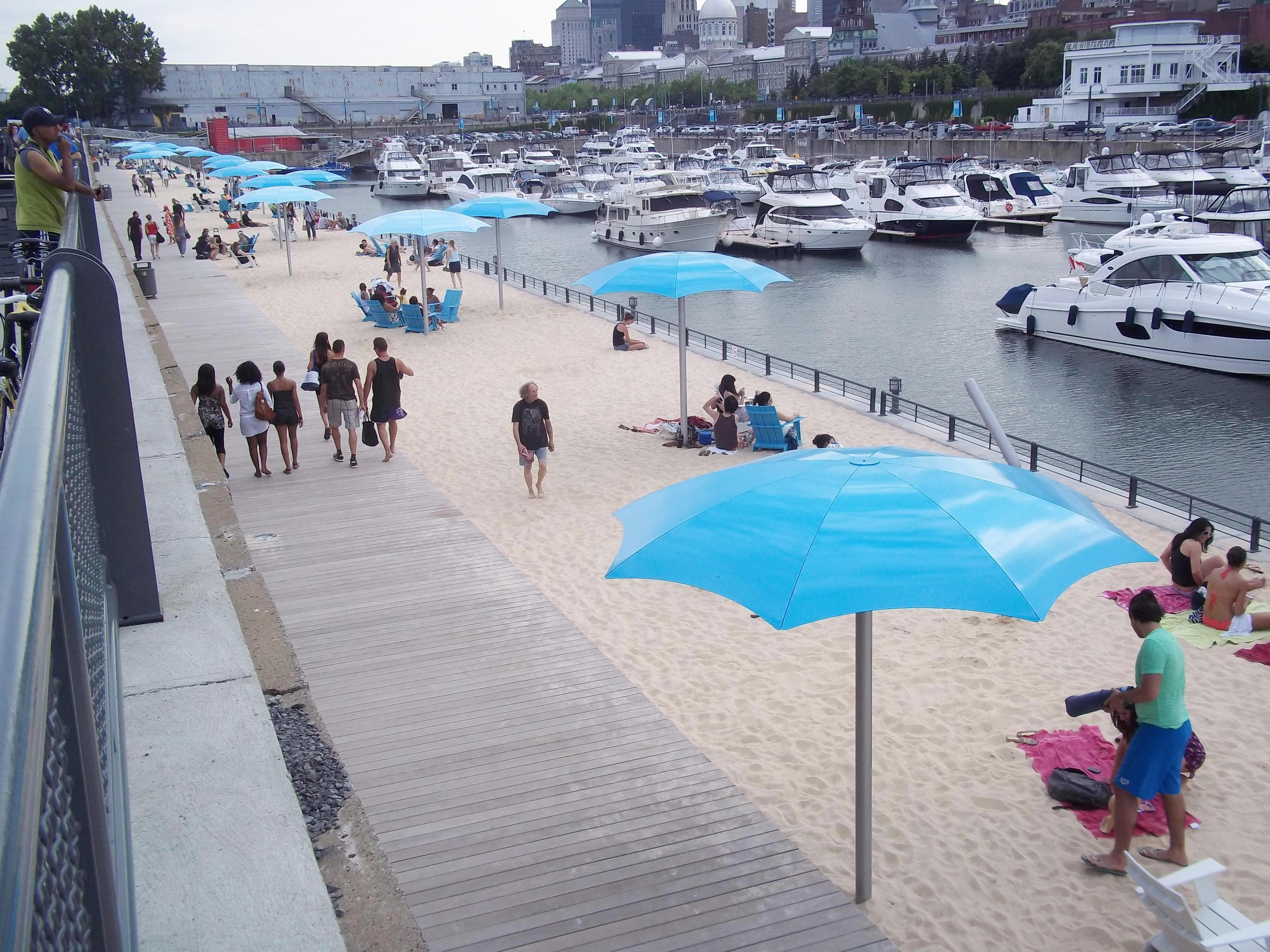
- The beach in 2012

- Location within Greater Montreal
- Coordinates: 45.5126°N 73.5460°W
- Location: Saint Lawrence River, Montreal, Quebec, Canada
- Age: 2012
- Formed by: Manmade
- Website: Official website

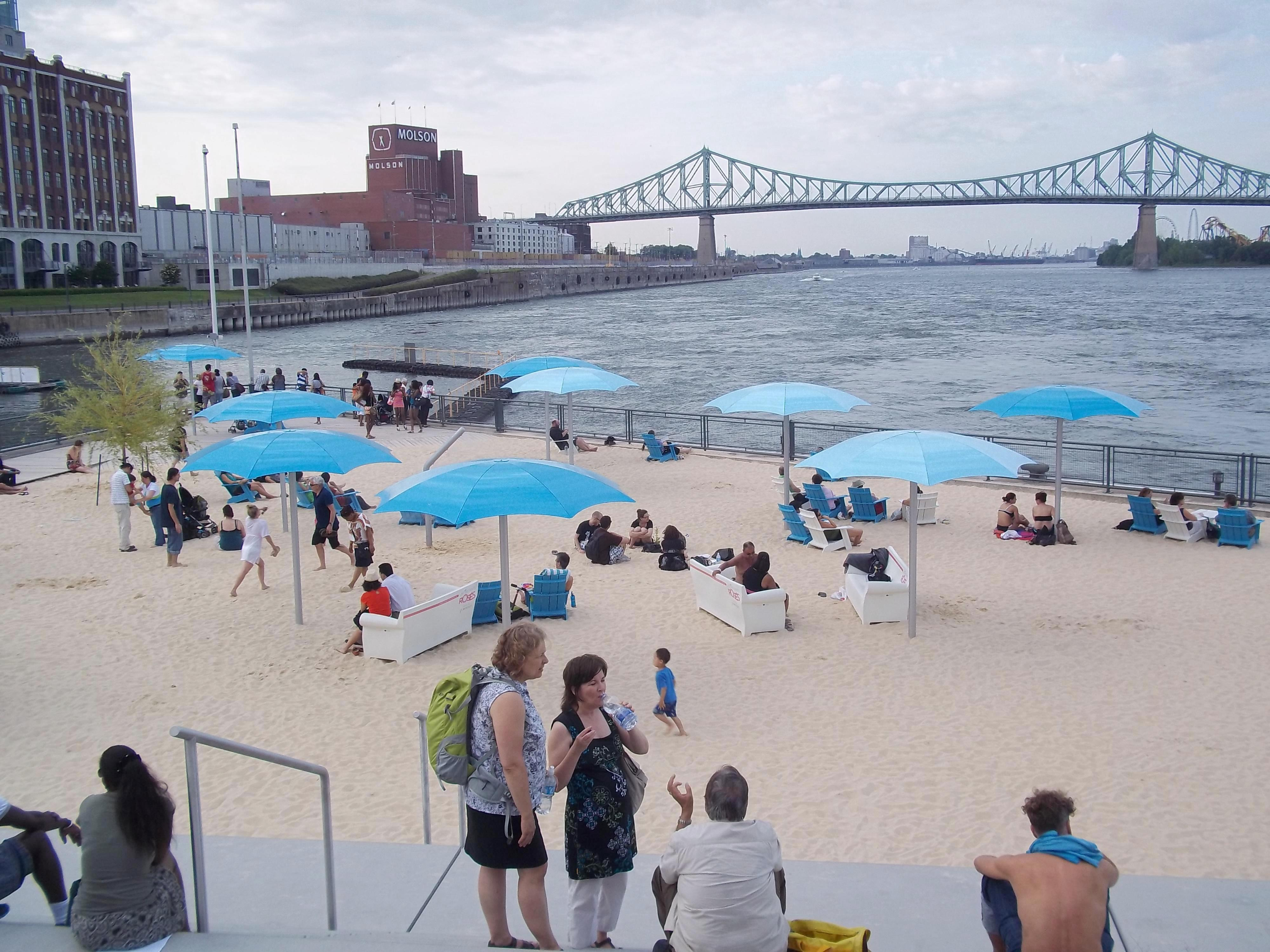
Clock Tower Beach, 2012

Clock Tower Beach (French: Plage de l'Horloge) is an urban beach on the Saint Lawrence River in Montreal, adjacent to the Montreal Clock Tower in the Old Port of Montreal.

== Description and history ==
The beach opened in 2012. It consists of sand, Muskoka chairs, a boardwalk, a bar, showers and misting stations. Visitors are charged a fee for admission. Work began on the site in the fall of 2011, including the installation of parasols. The beach was designed by Claude Cormier, who has also designed urban beaches in Toronto.
