= Old Port of Montreal–Longueuil Ferry =

Summer ferry service

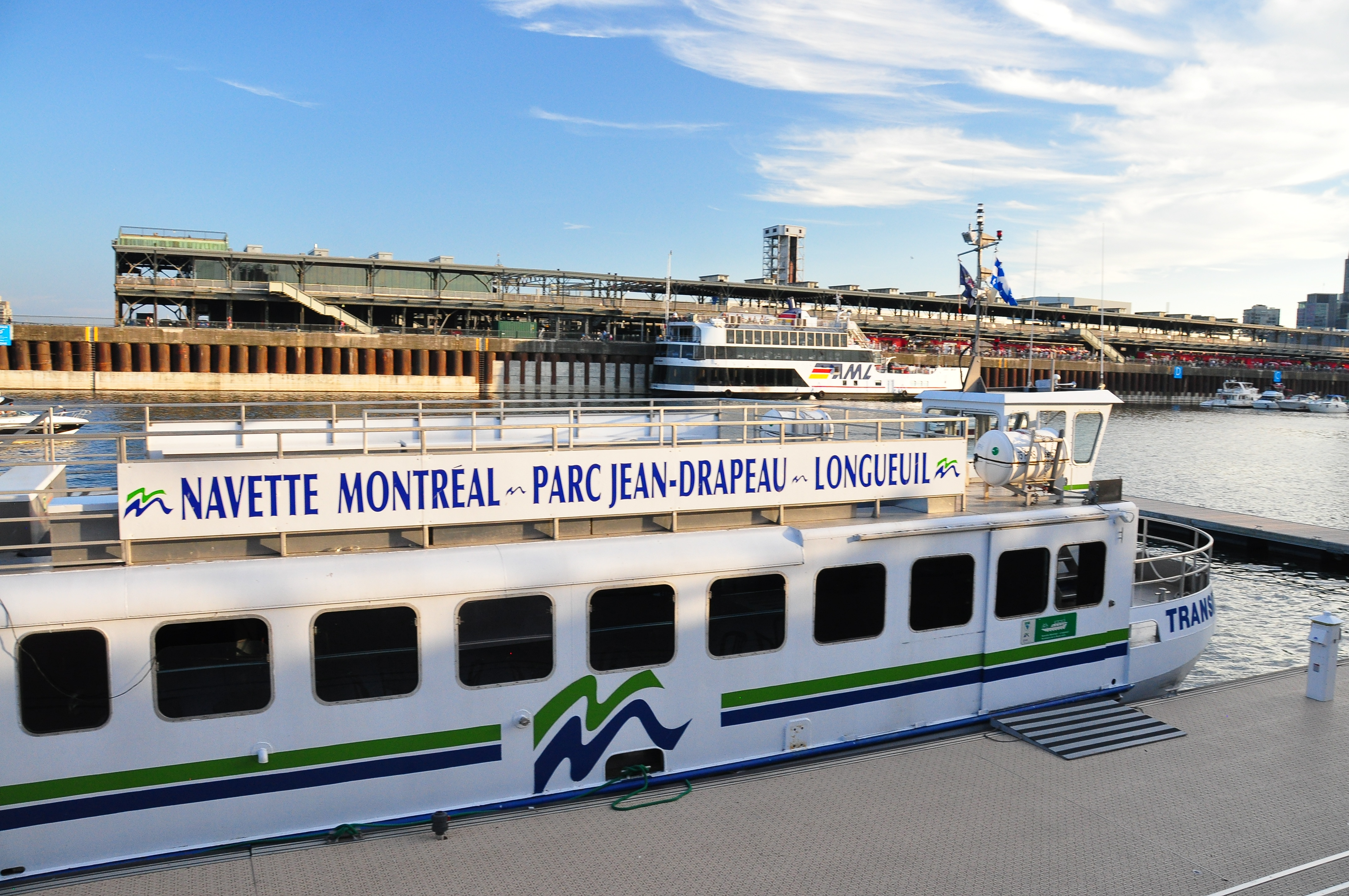
- Locale: Montreal-Longueuil, Quebec, Canada
- Waterway: Saint Lawrence River
- Transit type: Ferry
- Operator: Navette Maritimes du Saint-Laurent / Croisières AML
- System length: 7 kilometres (4.3 mi)
- No. of terminals: 3
- Website: www.navettesmaritimes.com/index_en.html

The Old Port of Montreal–Longueuil Ferry is a Summer ferry service operating on the Saint Lawrence River between Montreal and Longueuil, Quebec, Canada. It carries pedestrians and cyclists from the Réal Bouvier Marina in Longueuil to Saint Helen's Island and the Jacques-Cartier Pier Old Port of Montreal.

It operates from late-May until early-October, with hourly departures during regular business hours seven days a week from late-June to early-September. The length of the crossing is 5.5 kilometres (3.4 mi).

The ferries are capable of going at speeds of up to 12 knots (22 km/h). They are 68 feet (21 m) long and 22 feet (6.7 m) wide. They have a capacity of 196 passengers, or 150 passengers and 70 bicycles.

Both ends of the ferry crossing are linked to Quebec's Route Verte bicycle trail network.
