= Cercles des Jeunes Naturalistes =

Quebec based non-profit

Les Cercles des jeunes naturalistes (CJN) is a Quebec-based non-profit organization which has been seeking to foster an interest in nature and natural sciences among young people for over 80 years.

== History ==
The CJN was officially founded on February 27, 1931 by Brother Adrien Rivard of the Sainte-Croix congregation. In the beginning, the organization was supported by the Société Canadienne d'Histoire Naturelle. This society, established by Brother Marie-Victorin, in 1923, encouraged the popularization and study of natural sciences in Canada, the development of scientific research projects and the creation of connections between Canadian and international scholars.

At first, the organization was described by Marie-Victorin as a structure that would allow schoolchildren to establish connections with the members of the SCHN. In 1946 the partnership between the CJN and the SCHN became official as certain rules of its constitution were modified. Among other things, it was specified that the CJN was connected to the SCHN and that its main goals were to: a) stimulate and promote the study of natural sciences b) encourage young people to show initiative and be observant c) encourage the protection of our natural resources and the embellishment of our properties. Even though the CJN were allowed the greatest latitude under the SCHN direction, on October 29, 1957 its members decided to separate from the Society. That same year, the CJN became a non-profit organization. During the first half of the 20th century, the CJN appears to have played an important part in the teaching of Natural Sciences in Quebec. In fact, until 1964, most specifically until a Public Education Network was created, each and every school board of the province was allowed to form its own programs and handbooks. In many cases, those did not include appropriate information or activities related to Natural Sciences. In fact, at the time, the educational system was starting to be severely criticized by the French Canadian Intelligentsia (among others, Brother Marie-Victorin and André Pouliot). In that sense, the formation of "circles" among religious schools across the province, appeared as a solution to improve the educational system's image without reforming it . Until the 1970s, the circles were, indeed, almost exclusively founded among religious schools and consisted, mostly, of young girls. The movement which had blossomed in Quebec during the 1960s (with more than 30 000 members) would lose momentum in the 1970s. In fact, after the Ministry of Education was created, a lot of circles disappeared. During the last three decades the CJN has been supporting around 100 circles a year (between 1000 and 2000 members). The corporate headquarters of the CJN is still located in the administrative building of the Montreal Botanical Garden.

== Prominent members of the CJN ==
Brother Adrien Rivard (1890–1969) : Founder and director of the CJN (1931–1947). Brother Marie-Victorin (1885–1944) : President of the SCHN (1925–1940), Founder and Director of the Montreal Botanical Garden (and its Institute) and author of the Laurentian Flora (1935). Marcelle Gauvreau (1907–1968) : Assistant secretary (1933–1936) and Head of secretary (1938–1950) of the CJN. Author of a master's thesis entitled "Les algues marines du Québec" (1939). Sister Marie Jean-Eudes (1897–1978) : Member of the CJN administration (1945–1963) and author of a master's thesis entitled "La flore de Rawdon" (1943). Dollard Sénécal (1912–2002) : Member of the CJN administration (1954–1976).

== Mission ==
- Encourage children to exercise and eat well
- Teach children to become more observant and to work according to a systematic method
- Encourage children to get involved in scientific activities
- Help children develop a sense of teamwork and encourage them to communicate in a group
- Encourage children to get involved in eco-friendly activities and to respect nature
- Supervise, support and train the CJN's volunteers

== Services ==
The many activities and services provided by the CJN include the following:

- Workshops
- Games and educational activities
- Scientific publications, including books
- A national secretary office and library
- Presentations during environmental events
- Activities related to Natural Sciences among schools and community centers

== Logos (1931-2011) ==
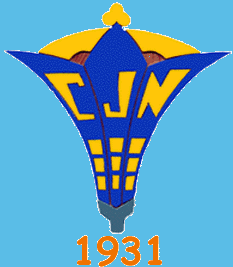
foundation logo

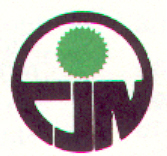
1960

== See also ==
- Pierrick Malissard, "Les Cercles des jeunes Naturalistes: ampleur et nature du mouvement, 1931-1971", Revue d'histoire de l'Amerique francaise, vol 50, no 1 (1996), p. 3-27.
