= Urban beach =

Artificial beach environment in an urban setting

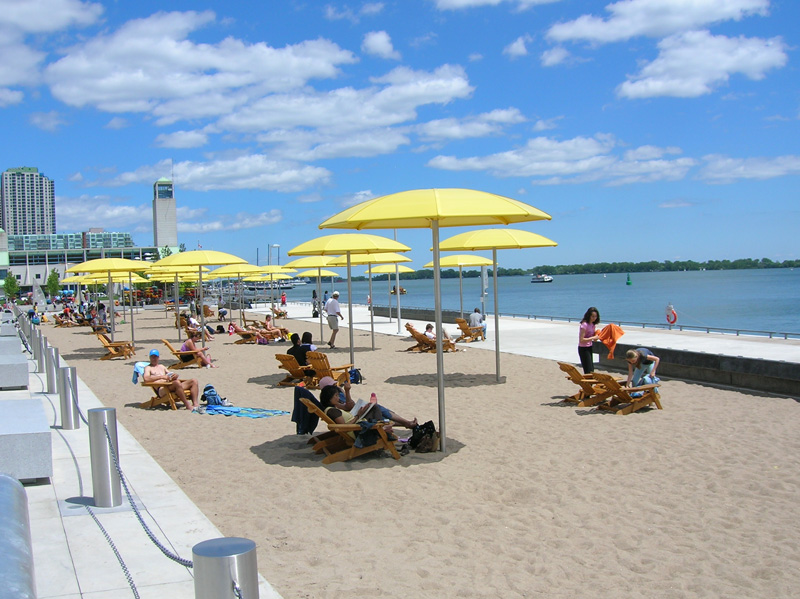
Urban beach at HTO Park in Toronto

An urban beach (also city beach and sometimes beach club) is an artificially-created environment in an urban setting which simulates a public beachfront, through the use of sand, beach umbrellas, and seating elements.

There are many variations of urban beaches. Urban beaches are often found along waterways, though some are inserted into town squares or other spaces far from water. The beach may be a seasonal installation over a roadway or parking lot, or it may be permanent.

Urban beaches are not necessarily publicly owned, though they generally remain open to the public (sometimes with an admission fee). Where river or ocean swimming is not possible, many urban beaches include water features -- for example fountains, wading pools or misting towers -- for cooling off. Some urban beaches feature entertainment, or food and beverage areas. A few include sports facilities such as beach volleyball, beach soccer, and cornhole.

Most urban beaches are designed to appeal to a general population, including families, young singles, and older citizens. Although an urban beach may not have facilities for swimming, swimwear is commonly seen alongside the more usual attire seen in major urban centers.

Researchers have noted that while urban beaches provide recreation to the public, mechanical sand grooming and high visitor use can reduce biodiversity in near-shore environments.

The popularity of urban beaches increased in the early 21st century as the concept was championed by urban planners, landscape architects and local politicians.

== History ==
Natural urban beaches by the sea have attracted both tourists and locals for a long time, such as the Copacabana of Rio, the central beach of San Sebastián, or the City Beach in Stralsund. For example, the beach of Barcola is connected to the center of Trieste by bus and people of all ages take the opportunity to spend their free time by the sea. There are considerations to rebuild parts of the beach in Barcola, as it was largely overbuilt by road construction in the 19th century.

One of the earliest known man-made urban beaches, Tower Beach, was built on the Thames, England, in 1934. The Tower Beach was an immediate success, drawing half a million visitors from 1934 to 1939. The beach closed in 1971, due to pollution and safety concerns.

The modern urban beach concept as a summertime public amenity in the middle of the city was popularized by the Paris-Plages, a program of seasonal urban beach installations along the Seine. Paris Plages is the world's largest urban beach. It transforms a stretch of riverbank into a beach experience complete with sand, deck chairs, and water activities.

== Beach bars ==
Many waterfront restaurants and bars around the globe have beach-themed sections, and as these have grown larger and added size and features there has been some crossover with urban beaches. For example, the two artificial beaches in New York City and many of the manmade beaches in German cities feature enclosed beach areas open to visitors, but the spaces are managed by private entities as food and drinks venues and close frequently for concerts and events. Strictly speaking, such locations are private enterprises and not true urban beaches, which can include commercial ventures but should maintain an atmosphere of public space.

== List of beaches ==
This list is only of urban beaches as defined above, open to the public on a free or admission basis. It does not include fully private artificial beaches, natural beaches that exist in urban areas, playgrounds, dedicated waterparks or hardscape fountain plazas.

- Sand in the City in Vienna, Austria
- Paris-Plages in Paris, France (multiple locations)
- Marina beach in Chennai, India
- Strand Zuid in Amsterdam, the Netherlands
- Trukhaniv Island in Kyiv, Ukraine
- Docken in Copenhagen, Denmark
- Bruxelles Les Bains in Brussels, Belgium
- Madrid Rio in Madrid, Spain
- Beach on the Cobblestones in Cologne, Germany
- Strandbar Mitte in Berlin, Germany (multiple locations)
- Strandpauli in Hamburg, Germany (multiple locations)
- Docklands in Dublin, Ireland
- Spruce Street Harbor Park in Philadelphia, United States
- Manila Bay Dolomite Beach in Manila, Philippines
- Larvotto Beach in Monaco
- Gansevoort Peninsula in New York City, United States
- Birmingham-on-Sea and Northfield Beach in Birmingham, UK
- Sunny Beach in Shanghai, China
- Poniatówka in Warsaw, Poland
- Nottingham Riviera in Nottingham, UK
- Barking Urban Beach in Barking Town, UK
- Cardiff Bay Beach in Cardiff, UK
- Play Beach, Camden Beach and Greenwich Beach in London, UK
- Playa Villa in Mexico City, Mexico (ten locations)
- Sugar Beach, HTO Park and Whiskey Beach in Toronto, Canada
- Plage de l'Horloge in Montreal, Canada
- Valley of the waves in Johanessburg, South Africa
- Campus Martius in Detroit, United States
- Rotary Park in Lansing, Michigan, United States
- Pondi Beach, in Western Sydney, Australia
- Ruislip Lido in London Borough of Hillington, England
