= Canada Lands Company =

Crown corporation managing federal property

Canada Lands Company Limited Société immobilière du Canada
- Type: Federal Crown Corporation
- Industry: Real estate development, attractions management
- Founded: 1956 (as Public Works Lands Company Limited; 1981 (renamed Canada Lands Company); 1995 (reactivated)
- Headquarters: 1700-1 University Avenue, Toronto, Ontario, Canada
- Key people: Stéphan Déry (President and CEO); Kaye Melliship (Chairperson)
- Revenue: C$269.4 million (FY2018/19)
- Owner: Government of Canada
- Website: clc-sic.ca

Canada Lands Company Limited (French: Société immobilière du Canada) is a self-financing federal Crown corporation reporting to the Parliament of Canada through Public Services and Procurement Canada. The company is responsible for managing property on behalf of the federal government, conducting public consultation and integrating properties back into their surrounding communities for development. Most of its assets are located in Canadian urban centres, and are sold after the CLC revalued the property by providing managerial support and subsidizing immediate costs such as decontamination. However, the company retains ownership of some of Canada's most valued properties, such as Downsview Park, the CN Tower, the Old Port of Montreal and the Montreal Science Centre, from which it draws rental and hospitality revenues.

== History ==
The CLC was founded in 1956 as the Public Works Lands Company Limited (PWLCL). Its original function was to act as "an intermediary handling public land development, leases, permits, title transfers, etc. for other government departments". The PWLCL had little activity in the first few decades of its existence, and went dormant in the 1980s when the government's neoliberal program focused on privatization. It was renamed the Canada Lands Company Limited in 1981.

In the late 1980s and early 1990s, the government of Canada adopted legislation and policies that encouraged the sale of public lands and assets. Prior to this period, state ownership of land and corporations was supported by all political parties and was seen as necessary to bind colonial economies together and to assist the private sector through government intervention in the economy. Following the adoption of the Federal Real Property and Federal Immovables Act in 1991, government departments were incentivized to dispose of their holdings with no immediate benefits, with the idea that the private sector could make better use of it. The function of today's CLC originates in these policy changes.

Canada Lands was reactivated in August 1995 by the Government of Canada as a "federal nonagent commercial Crown corporation" for the disposition of physical government properties deemed superfluous. It is mandated by the government to act as its agent for the disposal of such assets, and the government is the company's only shareholder. The necessity of the disposition of land and other physical assets was the result of the privatization of Canadian National Railway in 1995, as the government had excluded non-rail real estate assets from the privatization and re-activated Canada Lands as a holding company for these assets, and to dispose of high-value assets in urban areas. Any property deemed surplus by the government must be sold to the Canada Lands Company at fair market value, which must then develop, manage, or sell the property.

In the 2010s, CLC's major projects were the operation and development of the CN Tower and surrounding areas, and the redevelopment of decommissioned Canadian Forces bases across Canada into pricey residential units.

== Mandate ==
The goal of the corporation as determined by Cabinet since 1995 has been to ensure "the commercially oriented, orderly disposition of surplus properties with optimal value to the Canadian taxpayer".

=== Work ===
The CLC treats their holdings as financial assets. They appraise the value of their holdings exclusively from an exchange-value point of view, and recommends property management and redevelopment schemes directly aimed at increasing the land exchange value. In contrast, in UK land disposals, surplus designation is based on the land’s operational value, and exchange value is only considered once it is determined that the land has no value for the government.

The CLC also subsidizes the initial costs of developing the property, such as "the removal of debris and contaminated soil or other environmental hazards. Other preparation work may include the renovation of existing roads, the demolition of unsafe structures and the installation of new roads and other municipal services (for example: sewers, streetlights, etc.)."

=== Privatization ===
Heather Whiteside describes the CLC as an "agent of privatization, akin to PPP Canada and the Canada Infrastructure Bank". She says the "CLC provides regulatory-managerial support for privatization by collecting rent to subsidize property development, by commercializing public space, and by financializing public land."

== Governance ==
The chair of the company and its board members are appointed by the Governor-in-Council. It is a self-financing company operated at arm's length from the government that reports to the Minister of Public Services and Procurement. It functions as a "private sector, full-service real estate company". Unlike other government agencies, it is able to borrow money from capital markets, use letters of credit, and hold cash and other short-term financial instruments.

== Holdings ==
CLCL is the parent of three subsidiary companies: Parc Downsview Park Inc. (which manages Downsview Park in Toronto), Old Port of Montreal Corporation (which manages attractions in the Old Port of Montreal historic area including the Montreal Science Centre), and Canada Lands Company CLC Limited (which manages all other holdings such as the CN Tower).

The company has a real estate portfolio totalling approximately 2,400 acres (970 ha) in municipalities across Canada. The initial portfolio included many properties formerly controlled by the Canadian National Railway Company, which was privatized in 1995. Most of these properties were highly hazardous, and the CLC took care of their decontamination and redevelopment. The remediation of the CN's Shop Yard in Moncton, New Brunswick is often touted as one of the CLC's success, as they recycled 4000 tons of scrap metal, removed 120 000 tons of lead contamination and 30 000 tons of wood, and installed a kilometre of pipes and drainage. This work "turned a vacant 'eye sore' into a place for community and business activity."

This portfolio subsequently increased in size as the Department of National Defence (DND) began closing military bases across the country after the end of the Cold War. In the 1990s, government officials floated the idea using these DND surplus lands for public services such as social housing. CLC purchased several former DND bases that were closed during this process, and it later began to redevelop them. Today, after being handled by the CLC, these ex-military bases are, for the most part, pricey residential units.

Of its original portfolio when the company was re-activated in 1995, 70% had been sold by 2006.

=== Current projects ===
Canada Lands Company's current real estate projects include:

- Wateridge Village/Village des Riverains, Ottawa, Ontario (in development)
- Village at Griesbach, Edmonton, Alberta (in development)
- Currie, Calgary, Alberta (in development)
- Shannon Park, Dartmouth, Nova Scotia
- Jericho Lands, Vancouver, British Columbia (in partnership with the Musqueam, Squamish, and Tsleil-Waututh Nations)
- Heather Street Lands, Vancouver, British Columbia
- Downsview Redevelopment, Toronto, Ontario (in partnership with Northcrest of PSP Investments, planning started in 2020)

Canada Lands Company's completed major real estate developments include:

- Les Bassins du Nouveau Havre, Montreal, Quebec
- Benny Farm, Montreal, Quebec
- Moncton Sportsplex, Moncton, New Brunswick
- River's Edge, Chilliwack, British Columbia
- Garrison Crossing, Chilliwack, British Columbia
- Garrison Woods, Calgary, Alberta
- Garrison Green, Calgary, Alberta

== Indigenous relation ==
CLC land is sometimes used to resolve Indigenous specific land claims. An example of this is the 2014 transfer of the Jericho lands in urban Vancouver to three First Nations groups (the Musqueam, Squamish, and Tsleil-Waututh nations). The land deal is worth $237 million.

As part of its joint venture with the Algonquins of Ontario, the CLC is redeveloping the site at 299 Carling Avenue. Canada Lands entered into a Participation Agreement with the Algonquins of Ontario for the redevelopment of the former CFB Rockcliffe in Ottawa, now known as Wateridge Village.

CLC is also participating in the development of Naawi-Oodena, the former Kapyong Barracks in southwest Winnipeg, and the largest urban reserve in Canada.
