= Montreal Science Centre =

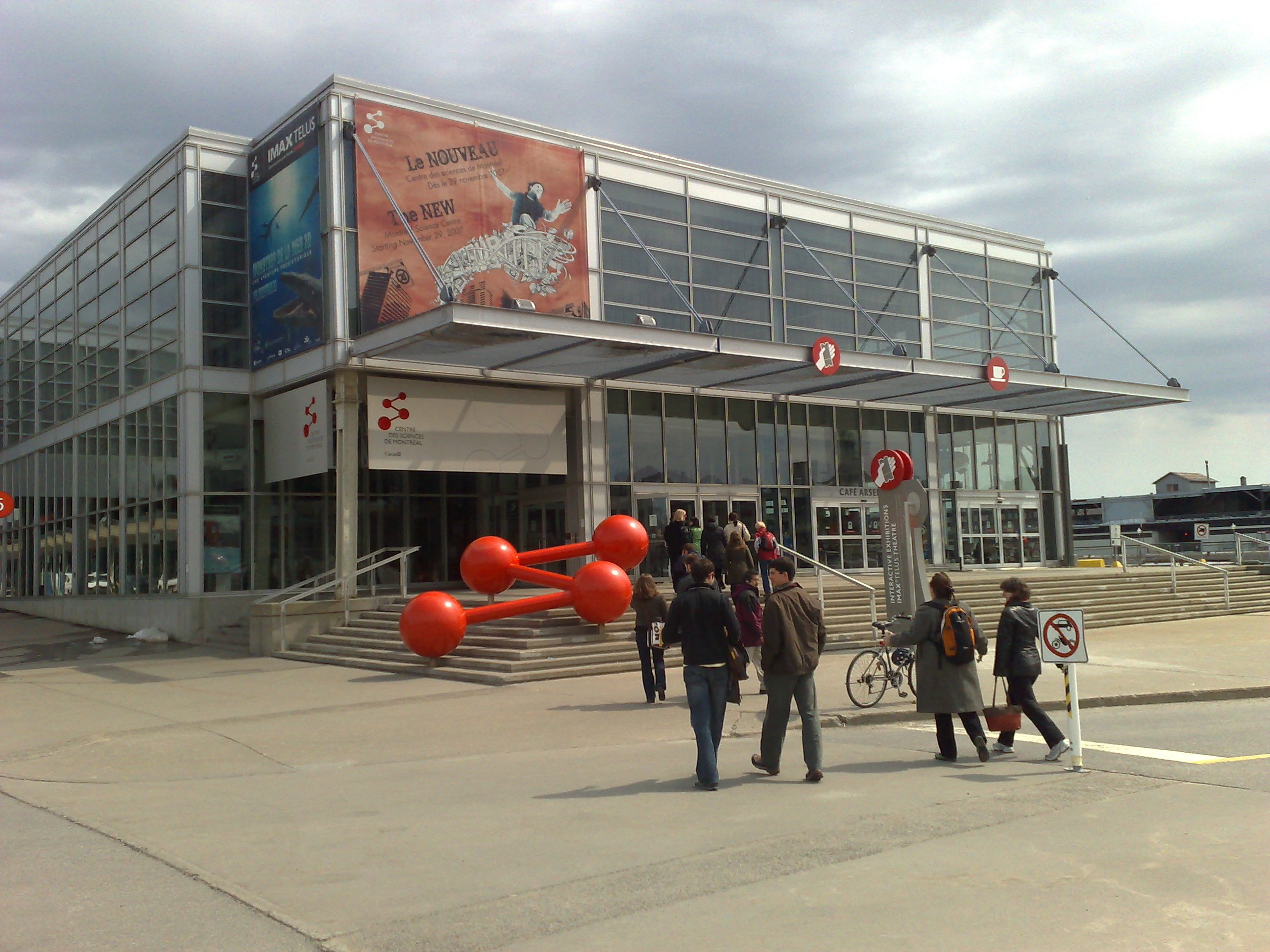

- Location of the Science Centre in Montreal
- Established: May 1, 2000
- Location: 2 Commune Street West; Montreal, Quebec, Canada; H2Y 4B2
- Coordinates: 45.505°N 73.55°W
- Type: Non-profit / non-governmental Science museum
- Visitors: 764,405 (2011)
- Owner: Old Port of Montreal Corporation
- Public transit access: at Place-d'Armes
- Website: Montreal Science Centre

The Montreal Science Centre (French: Centre des sciences de Montréal) is a science museum in Montreal, Quebec, Canada. It is located on the Quai King-Edward in the Old Port of Montreal. Established in 2000 and originally known as the iSci Centre, the museum changed its name to the Montreal Science Centre in 2002. The museum is managed by the Old Port of Montreal Corporation (a division of the Canada Lands Company, a crown corporation of the Government of Canada). The museum is home to interactive exhibitions on science and technology as well as an IMAX theatre.

== History ==
The King Edward Quay was built in 1901 to 1903 as King Edward Wharf for cargo ships, but the port area began to change in the 1970s as port activity moved to the new Port of Montreal. By the 1990s King Edward Quay was re-developed along with the rest of the Old Port.

== Special exhibitions ==
- Body Worlds: Animal Inside Out - part of Gunther von Hagens's Body Worlds exhibitions that includes a series of plastinated animal sculptures.

== See also ==
- Space for Life, a related museum district situated in and adjacent to Montreal's former Olympic Park
- List of science centers
