= Pocket Planet Canada =

Tourist attraction in Toronto

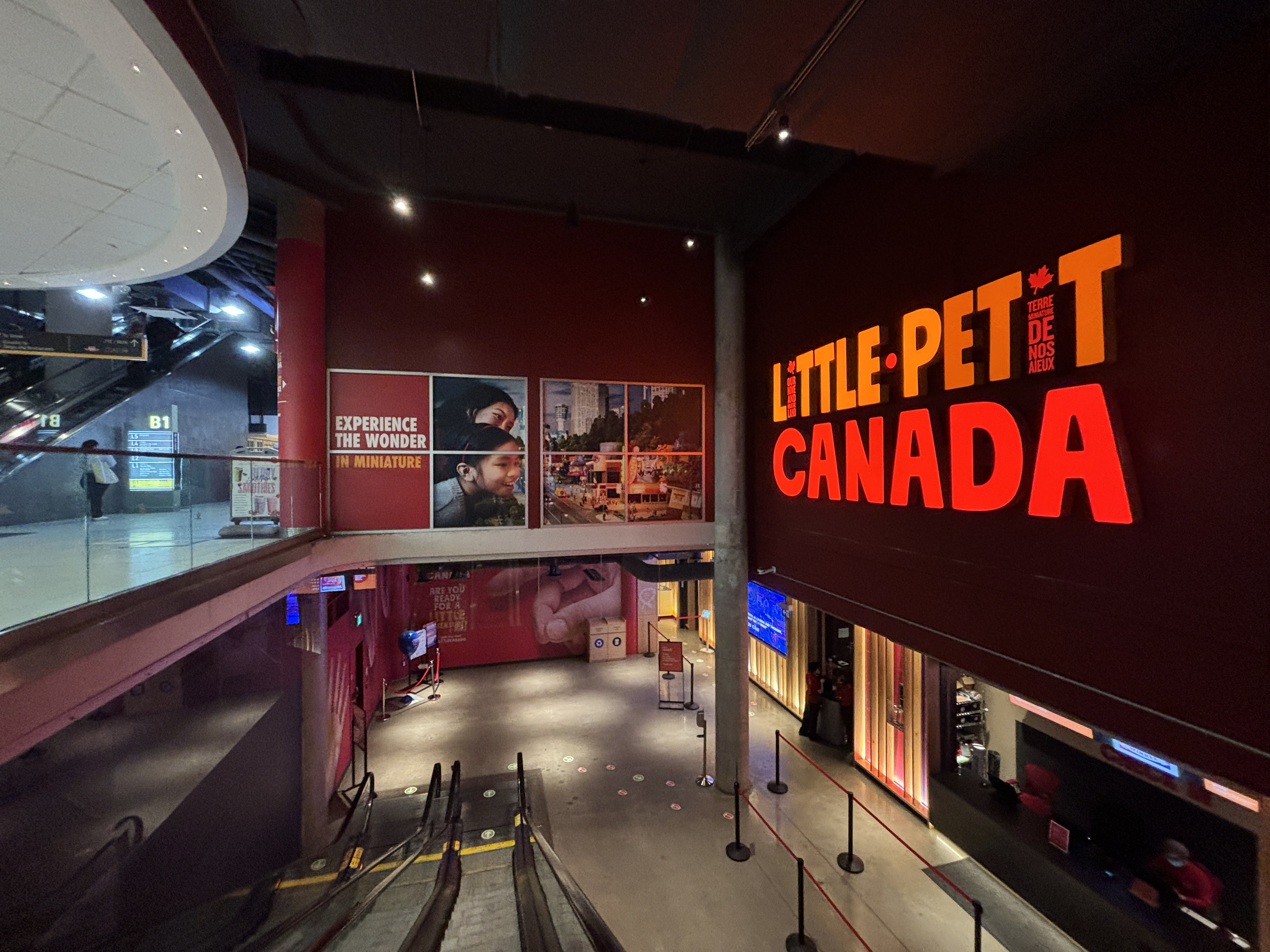
- The entrance under its former name

Downtown Toronto
- Coordinates: 43°39′24″N 79°22′50″W
- Status: Operating
- Opening date: 5 August 2021

Pocket Planet Canada, previously known as Little Canada and Our Home and Miniature Land, is North America's largest animated miniature world and tourist attraction located in the basement of The Tenor, near Sankofa Square in Toronto, Ontario, Canada. Its entrance is located next to Dollarama and across from both an entrance to TMU station of the Toronto subway. Pocket Planet Canada contains HO scale replicas of natural and man-made structures located throughout Canada, including Golden Horseshoe, Niagara Falls, Ottawa, Quebec City, and Toronto. HO is a 1:87 scale, so 3.5 mm is equal to one foot. It opened on 5 August 2021.

== History ==
Dutchman Jean-Louis Brenninkmeijer moved to Canada in 1999 for a two-year stint of specialty retail management training at his family's company C&A Canadian stores. He and his wife Mimi decided to make the move permanent, settling in Oakville. He created the concept for Little Canada in 2011 shortly after visiting Miniatur Wunderland in Hamburg, Germany, the largest model railway system in the world.

Brenninkmeijer sent emails to eight model railway clubs in the Greater Toronto and Hamilton Area (GTHA) requesting assistance to realize his vision for a miniature Canada. Only David MacLean, a civil engineer and president of The Model Railroad Club of Toronto, agreed to consider the project, and later met with Brenninkmeijer at Square One Shopping Centre in Mississauga. They would eventually meet every other week for 18 months, and in 2013 incorporated Our Home and Miniature Land.

Brenninkmeijer invested CA$5 million to develop the project, and received an additional CA$12 million for the project from 120 investors. By July 2021, the total investment had been CA$24 million from 200 investors.

At least 100 model enthusiasts were hired; from 2014 to 2019, they collectively worked about 100,000 hours in a Mississauga warehouse to create the scale-model components. Among them were about 50 artists, including model makers, specialists in mechatronics and animation, and scenic artists. Other specialists included architects, digital artists, electricians, painters, plumbers, sculptors, and visual artists.

The exhibit was designed to be assembled and disassembled, allowing for it to be moved. The attraction was moved to 10 Dundas Street East in Toronto when two underground storeys of that building were vacated by GoodLife Fitness in mid-2019. They signed a 20-year lease for that location in August 2019. The destinations of the attraction are installed in two storeys covering 45,000 square feet (4,200 m^{2}).

The attraction was expected to open in July 2020, but was delayed as a result of the COVID-19 pandemic in Ontario. In 2023, Brad Ford was named president and CEO of the company.

In 2026, Little Canada was acquired by Pocket Planet, a UK company, and the name of the attraction was changed to Pocket Planet Canada.

== Destinations ==
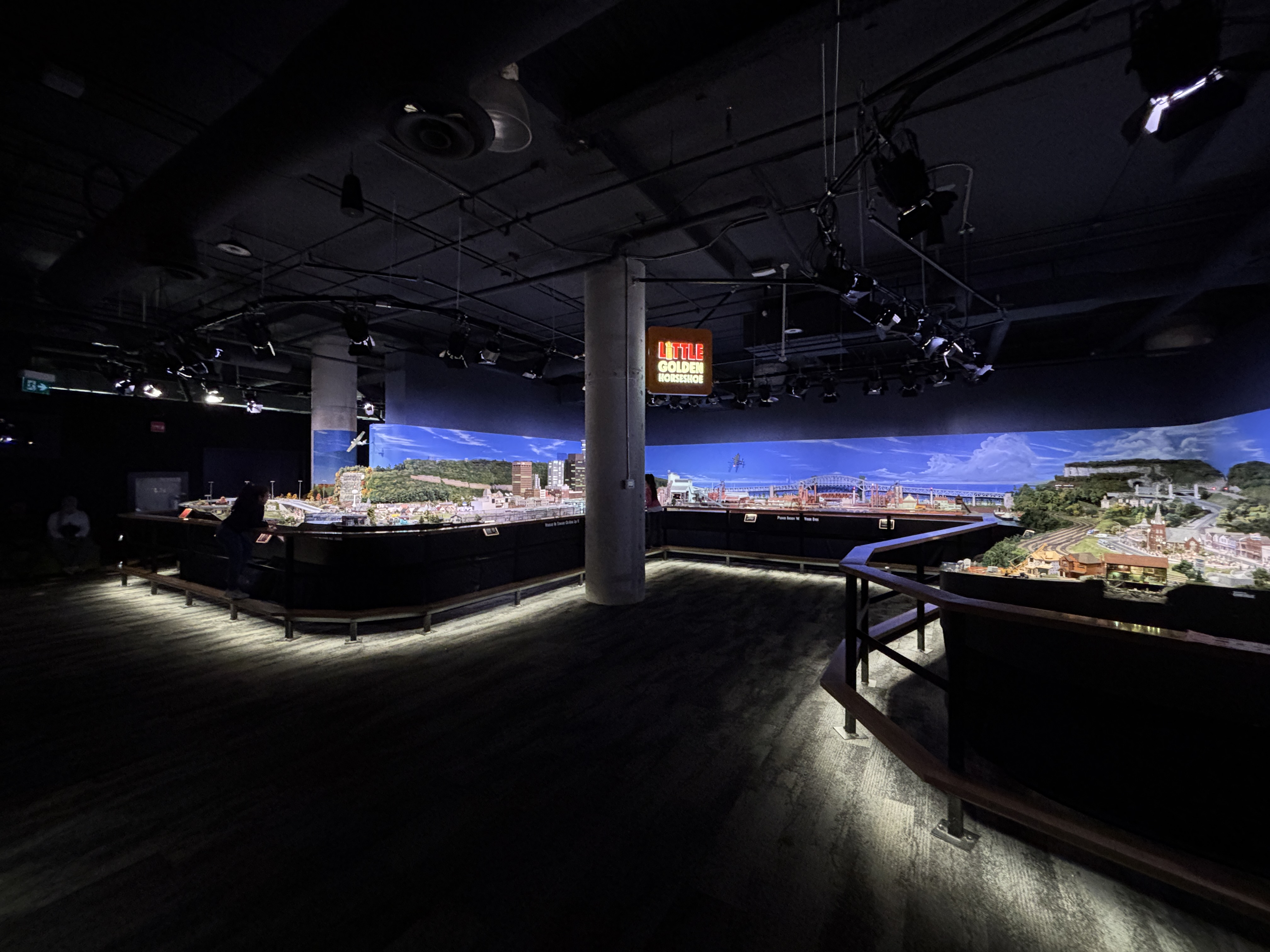
Little Golden Horseshoe

The attraction is split into a number of destinations, each representing some part of Canada. At its opening, these included Mini Golden Horseshoe (Golden Horseshoe), Mini Niagara (Horseshoe Falls and the city of Niagara Falls), Mini Ottawa (Ottawa), Mini Toronto (Toronto), Mini Quebec (Quebec City), Mini East Coast (The Maritimes), Mini West Coast (Vancouver, Victoria, British Columbia, Capilano, Okanagan, Tofino) and Mini North (Territories of Canada). Each destination undergoes a repeating 10-minute day cycle transition from sunrise to sunset.

The key features of each destination are built to scale, with some landmarks and buildings based on the structure's blueprints. Each was digitally designed and split into pieces that were then laser cut from various materials, including balsa, plywood, and styrene. Members of the team designing a destination travel to the site, and each destination has an assigned ambassador who provides "insight into the culture of a place".

The cost to design and build 1 square foot (0.093 m^{2}) was between $500 and $1,200, depending on the complexity of the design; a rural scene would have little variation and fewer features than a city block. Each destination requires 9 to 12 months to complete.

In November 2024, the attraction introduced Mini Media for out-of-home (OOH) advertisements embedded within the exhibits in scaled miniature billboards, transit shelters, murals, and other features.

=== Mini Toronto ===
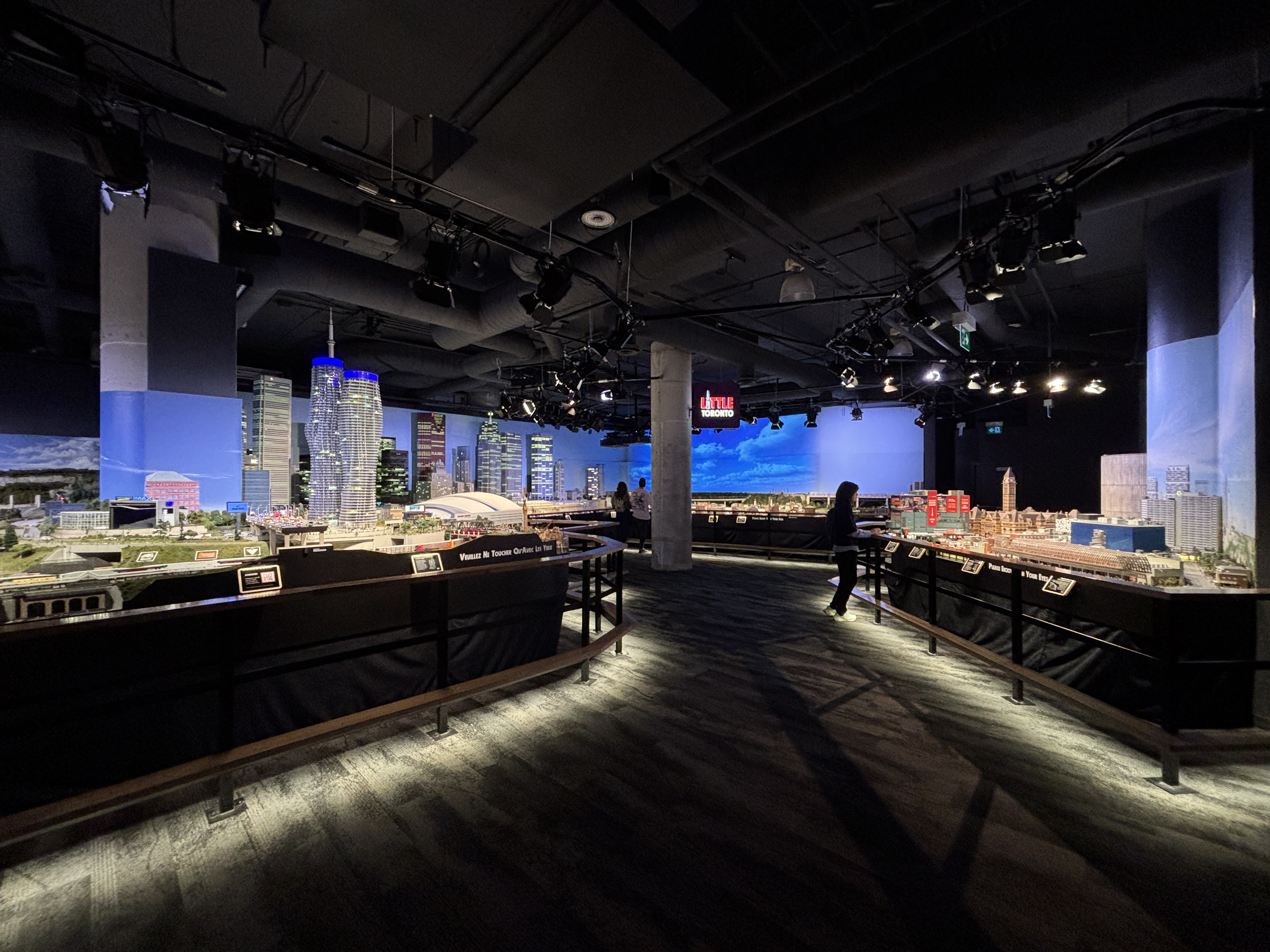
Little Toronto

The Toronto destination, which took over 35,000 hours to design and build, includes GO Transit trains and Union Station, the Art Gallery of Ontario, Toronto City Hall, helicopters, streetcars, the Don Valley Parkway, and the Gardiner Expressway. During the morning portion, sound effects include chirping birds, barking dogs, and garbage trucks making rounds. During the sunset portion of the exhibit, the skyline is lit by 30,000 LEDs, with sounds of crickets and sirens. The replica of the Rogers Centre, which cost $60,000 to build and occupies a space of 5 by 5 feet (1.5 by 1.5 m), has a functional retractable roof and contains a scoreboard that will show highlights from the preceding day's Toronto Blue Jays game. The field depicts the instance Joe Carter hit a walk-off home run to clinch the Blue Jays' victory in the 1993 World Series against the Philadelphia Phillies.

The CN Tower was limited to a height of 14 feet (4.3 m), as a 1/87 scale replica would not fit, and First Canadian Place and the Toronto-Dominion Centre are also smaller than 1/87 scale to ensure they would not touch the ceiling. The CN Tower also includes several figurines of individuals on the EdgeWalk. The Art Gallery of Ontario building had to be built smaller than scale, with portions truncated to fit within the allocated space.

Also depicted are historic sites and structures such as the Distillery District, Royal York Hotel, St. Lawrence Market, and Prince Edward Viaduct. In August 2025, the attraction renamed its miniature version of Yonge–Dundas Square to Little Sankofa Square in conjunction with the official renaming ceremony at the square by the municipal government.

=== Mini Ottawa ===
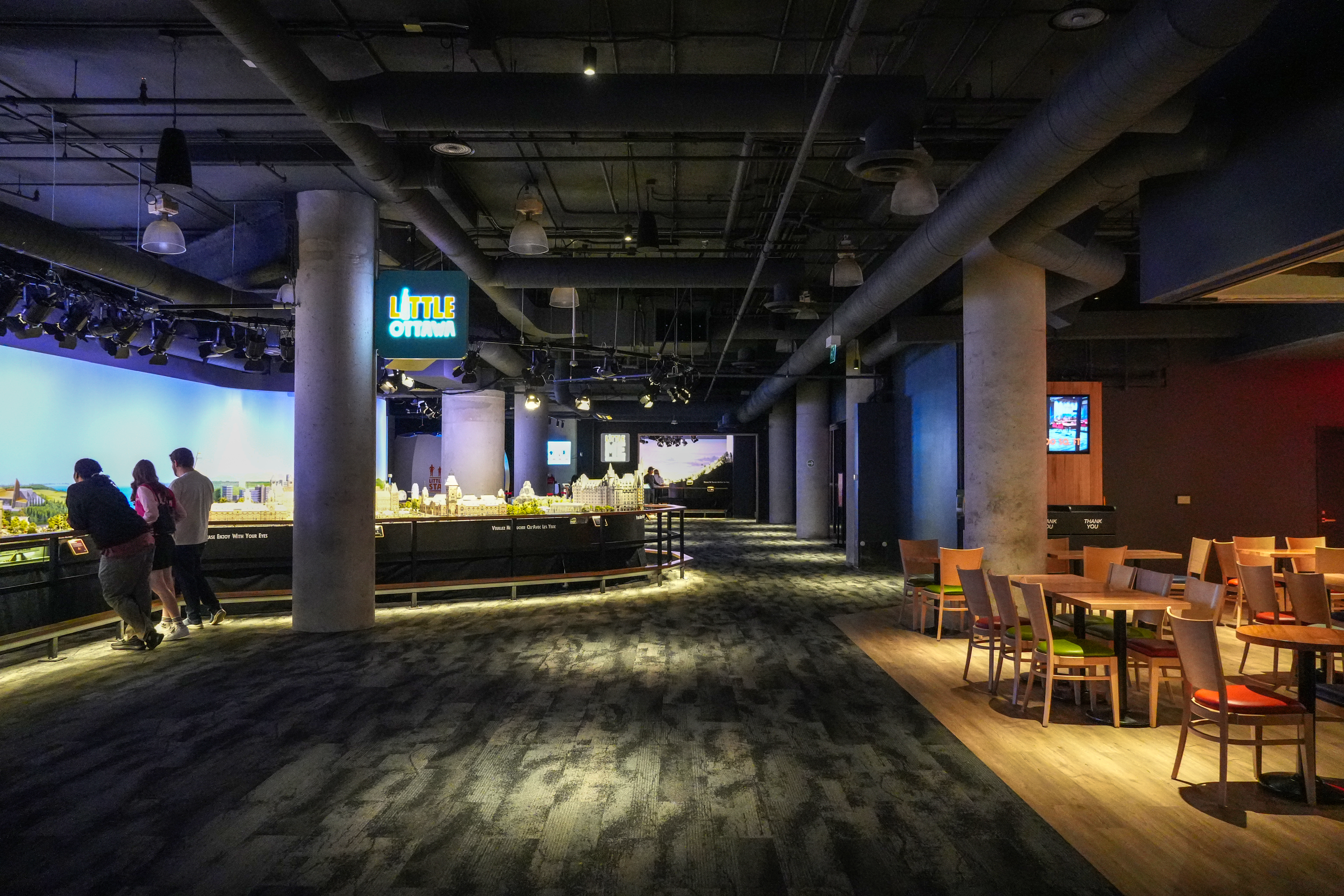
Little Ottawa

The Ottawa destination has a replica of the Canadian Parliament Buildings set during Canada Day, as well as the Château Laurier with a missing back wall to enable visitors to see the furnished rooms, and the Canada Revenue Agency building. Also part of the destination is the ByWard Market featuring horse-drawn carriages, and the Rideau Canal. The design includes particular attention to streetscape; for example, street signs have the same design as those in the city.

=== Mini Niagara ===
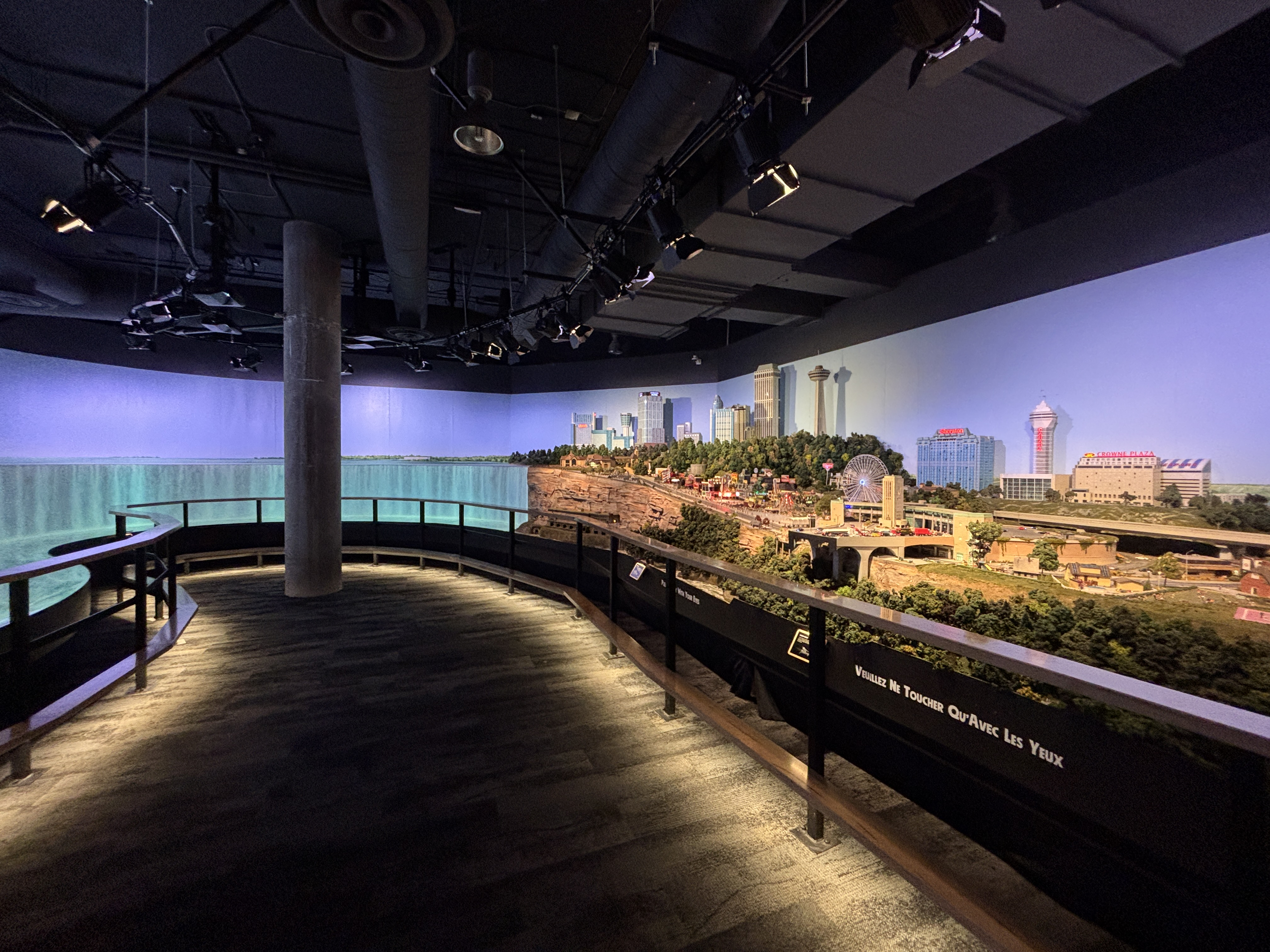
Little Niagara in 2025

The Niagara Falls destination features a flowing 50-foot (15 m) Horseshoe Falls, the Rainbow Bridge, Clifton Hill, and Niagara-on-the-Lake. The latter features vineyards.

=== Mini West Coast ===
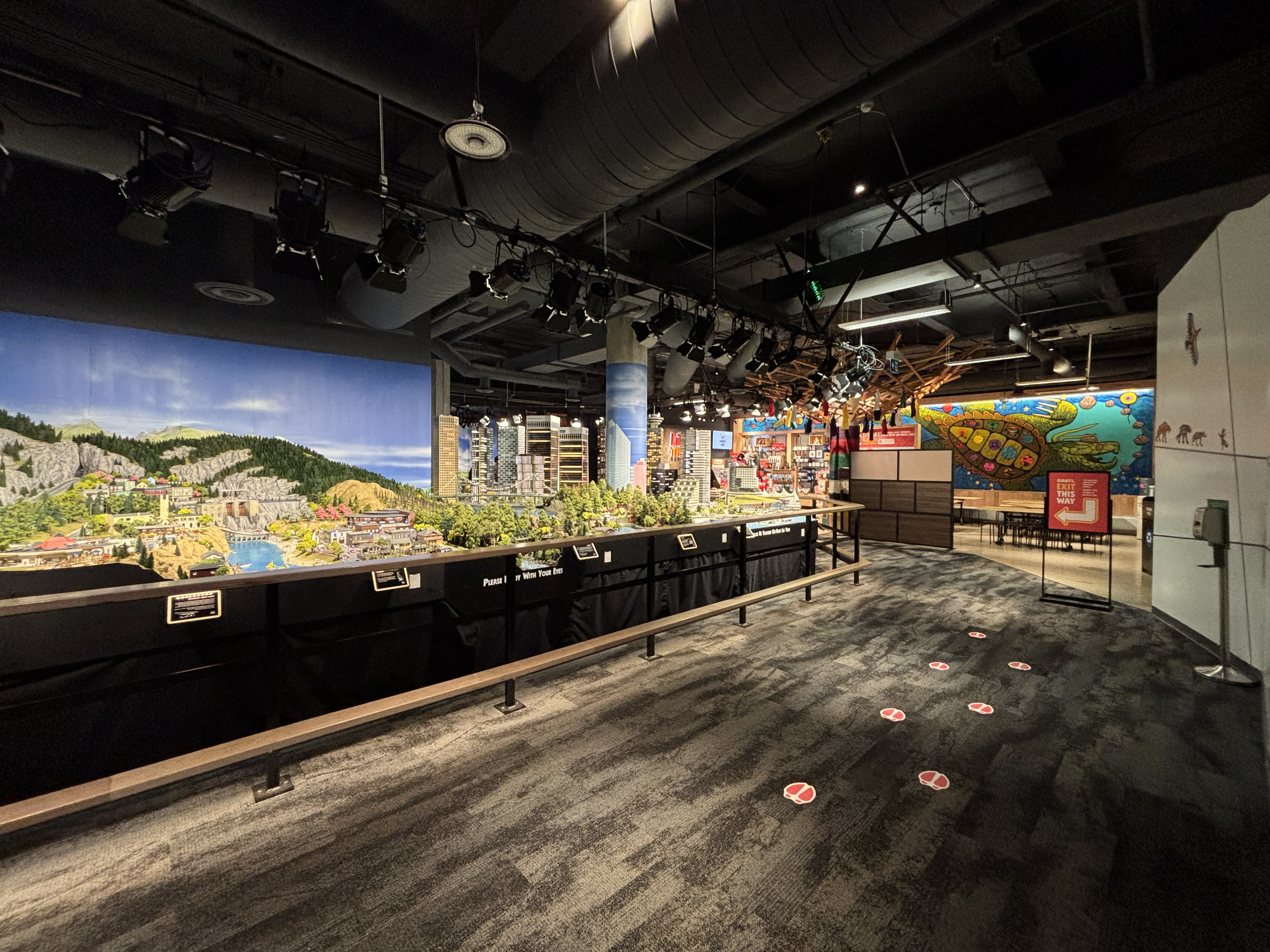
Little West Coast

Mini West Coast was the seventh destination in Pocket Planet Canada, and was unveiled in October 2024. Amongst its features are the cities of Vancouver, Victoria, and Tofino, the Okanagan Valley, and rainforests. Its unveiling introduced new animation to Little Canada, including rolling fog at the Rogers Pass feature. The Vancouver display includes Stanley Park, the Gastown neighbourhood with Dr. Sun Yat-Sen Classical Chinese Garden, and the Granville Market.

The destination required about 25,000 human-hours of work by 30 employees.

=== Mini East Coast ===
Mini East Coast depicts Atlantic Canada in a 720 square feet (67 m^{2}) exhibit, which includes sites from New Brunswick, Newfoundland and Labrador, Nova Scotia, and Prince Edward Island. The exhibit was opened on 19 May 2023 and was the first exhibit added to the attraction since its opening in 2021.

Landmarks include the Bay of Fundy, Cape Breton Island, the Cabot Trail, and Gros Morne National Park. Other sites include Le Pays de la Sagouine and Metepenagiag Heritage Park in New Brunswick; L'Anse Aux Meadows and Signal Hill in Newfoundland and Labrador; Halifax Harbour, the tall ships at Lunenburg including the Bluenose II, and Peggys Point Lighthouse in Nova Scotia; and Confederation House and Green Gables in Prince Edward Island. The Bay of Fundy exhibit has a 400 litres (110 US gal) basin simulating the bay's tides.

It also depicts activities and events such as the North American Indigenous Games.

=== Others ===
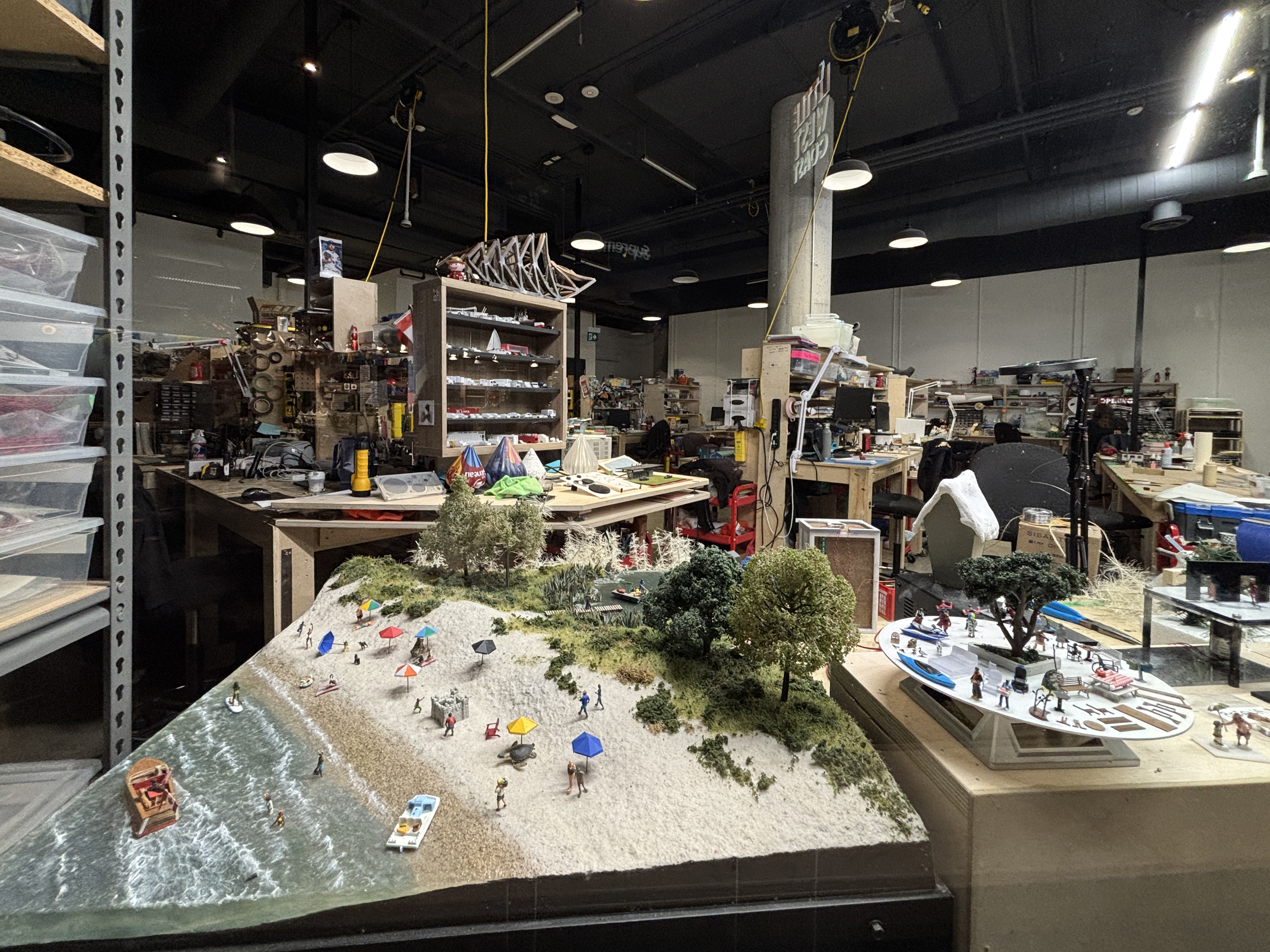
Miniature Maker's Studio

The Mini North exhibit is in a cooler, temperature-controlled room, so that visitors can see their breath as they exhale. The Golden Horseshoe destination includes a 14-foot (4.3 m) replica of the Burlington Bay James N. Allan Skyway, as well as the Highway of Heroes, a bridge over which is dedicated to Nichola Goddard, who died in a grenade attack in Panjwayi District in Afghanistan in May 2006, becoming the first Canadian woman to die in combat.

The Quebec City destination is set in the winter and includes the Château Frontenac, as well as nearby sites such as Mont-Sainte-Anne.

A portion of the exhibit will feature displays of incomplete destinations in progress of construction.

== Pocket Mini Studio ==
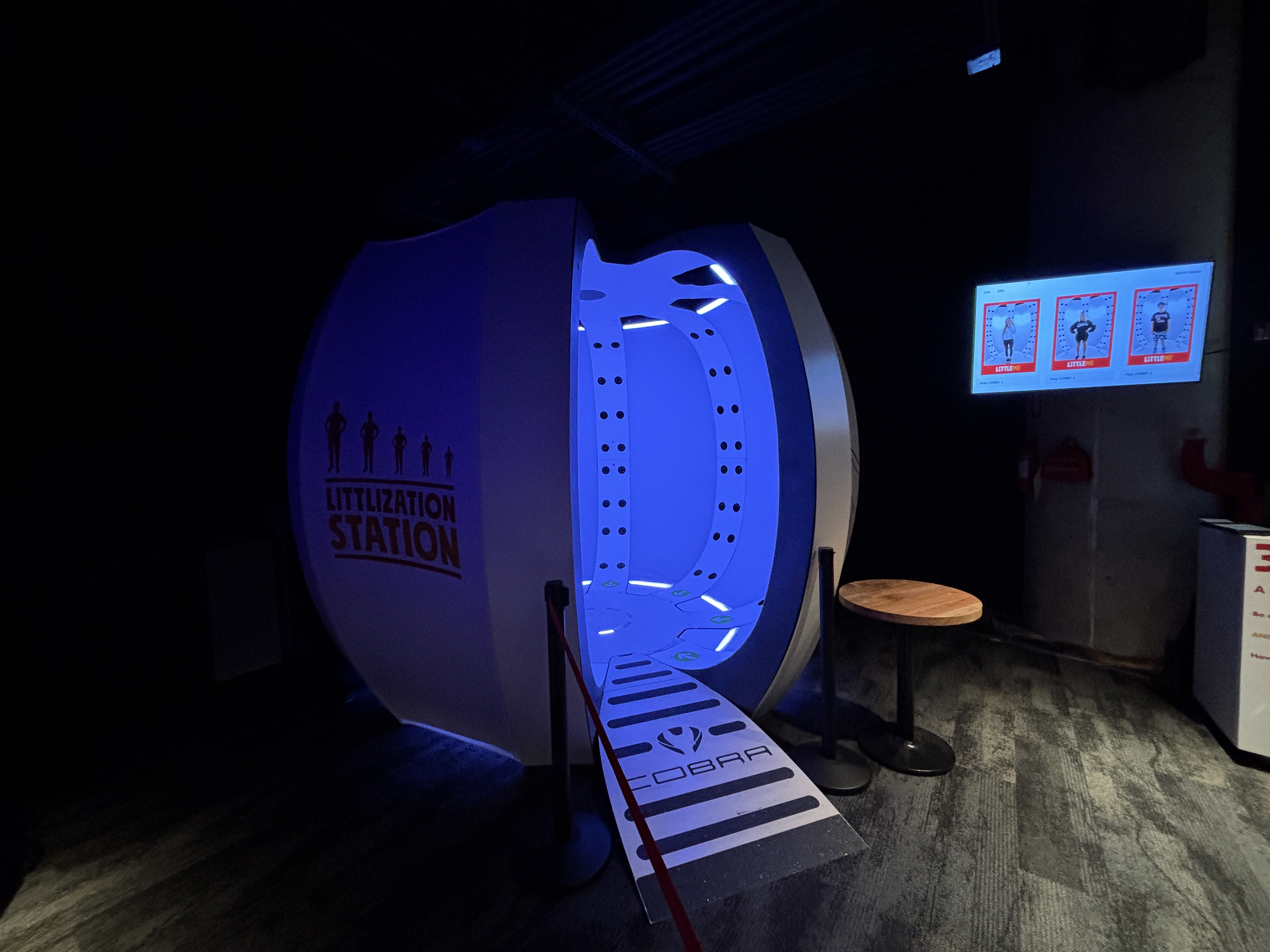
Littlization Station

Visitors can enter a booth called the "Mini Portal" at the attraction, which contains 128 cameras that will simultaneously take photographs of the visitor. These will be used to create two 1/87-scale replica 3D printed models of the individual, called Pocket Minis, one of which can be placed within the exhibit at a location chosen by the visitor, and the other taken home as a souvenir.

== Easter eggs ==
The exhibits contain numerous pop culture Easter eggs, such as a red panda from the film Turning Red in the Chinatown section of the Toronto exhibit.

== Awards ==
From 2022 to 2025, Pocket Planet Canada (formerly Little Canada) was named Ontario's Choice Awards Indoor Attraction of the Year by Attractions Ontario.

== See also ==
- Cullen Gardens and Miniature Village
