= Lorrie Dunington-Grubb =

English landscape architect

Lorrie Alfreda Dunington-Grubb
- Lorrie Dunington c. 1900
- Born: 1877; England
- Died: 17 January 1945 (aged 67–68); Hamilton, Ontario, Canada
- Occupation: Landscape gardener
- Known for: Sheridan Nurseries

Lorrie Alfreda Dunington-Grubb (1877 – 17 January 1945) was an English landscape architect. She moved to Canada in 1911 with her husband and business partner Howard Dunington-Grubb where they founded Sheridan Nurseries. She was active in garden design, a writer and a patron of the arts.

== Britain ==
Lorrie Alfreda Dunington was born in England in 1877. Her childhood was spent in India, South Africa and Australia. She attended Swanley Horticultural College in England where she studied garden design for two years. After graduating she obtained a position as head gardener of an Irish estate. She formed a partnership with H. Selfe-Leonard, a gardener particularly known for his rock gardens, and they designed gardens throughout Britain. Leonard was a follower of Gertrude Jekyll. Lorrie's love of herbaceous gardens may have come from Leonard, or through meeting with Jekyll herself.

Lorrie had the ambition of becoming a landscape architect. The profession was not taught in England at the time, but she managed to acquire the knowledge through private lessons and technical courses. She opened an office in London and practiced in Britain for several years, gaining a high reputation. In 1910 Lorrie Dunington met Howard Grubb, also a landscape architect, and the two married in the spring on 1911. They combined their surnames to become Mr. and Mrs. Dunington-Grubb.

== Canada ==
=== Landscape architect ===
Howard and Lorrie moved to Toronto in 1911. They quickly became busy with commissions for the boulevards and parks of the Lawrence Park suburb of Toronto, and with private commissions for landscaping the gardens of new homes there. Lorrie Dunington-Grubb worked on her own or with her husband on the design of private and public gardens, garden suburbs and town planning projects. In 1913 they received commissions to prepare plans for the subdivisions of Colvin Park in Buffalo, New York, Oriole Park in Toronto and the Workman's Garden Village for the Riordan Pulp and Paper Company in Hawkesbury, Ontario. In Toronto they also designed the grounds of the Old Mill Tea Room, the Humber Valley Surveys and the 15-acre Chorley Park. Later works included the Rainbow Bridge Gardens and Oakes Garden Theatre in Niagara Falls, Ontario, the McMaster University entrance gardens and Gore Park in Hamilton, Ontario.

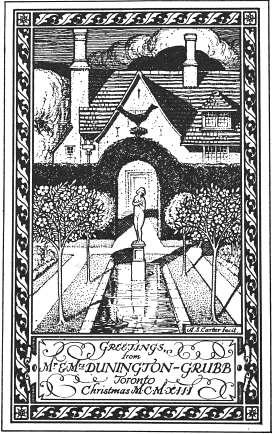
1913 Christmas card from the Dunington-Grubbs

The Dunington-Grubbs used sculpture and other artistic work in their garden designs, including the work of sculptors Fritz Winkler, Frances Loring and Florence Wyle and of painters J. E. H. MacDonald and Arthur Lismer. Thus the Italian Garden of the Parkwood Estate in Oshawa holds sculptures of Boy with a Goose by Winkler, Boy with Dolphin and Lady and the Shell by Wyle, Girl with the Squirrel by Loring and Boy on a Dolphin by Cleeve Horne. (Note: The Parkwood Estate was built for Samuel McLaughlin, founder of the McLaughlin automobile company and later the first president of General Motors Canada.) Their work in the Royal Botanical Gardens (1929) and the Niagara Parks in the 1930s reflects the ambivalent mood of the time in which native plants were seen as patriotic, but imported plants were also included as oddities and freaks.

=== Sheridan Nurseries ===
In 1913 the Dunington-Grubbs founded Sheridan Nurseries in the hamlet of Sheridan outside Oakville to the west of Toronto, on 100 acres (40 ha) of land of which about 20 acres (8.1 ha) were suitable for ornamental plants. They hired Sven Herman Stensson to run the nursery, whom they found through an advertisement in an English paper. By 1926 the nursery had grown to 250 acres (100 ha), with a wide range of trees, shrubs and perennials. The first seasonal garden centers were opened in the early 1920s near the Yonge and Bloor intersection in what is now downtown Toronto and on Southdown Road in Mississauga.

=== Other activities ===
Lorrie became involved with the Women's Art Association of Canada around 1915 and was president of the association from 1925 to 1930. Lorrie was also an active member of the Lyceum Club of Toronto and the Heliconian Club, both devoted to women's involvement in the arts. Lorrie belonged to societies such as the University Women's Club and the Council of Women. She spoke on social issues such as urban congestion, the price of food, affordable lodgings for women and female magistrates in women's and children's courts. She also gave lectures on housing and town planning at the University of Toronto and on city beautification for the Ontario Department of Agriculture. She wrote many articles on garden design for magazines such as Canadian Homes and Gardens, Maclean's and Woman's Century.

Due to their business, the Dunington-Grubbs mixed with the Toronto elite such as the Eaton, Massey and Gooderham families, hosting and attending important social events. The Dunington-Grubbs were at the center of a small group of landscape artists that used to meet in the garden of the Diet Kitchen Restaurant, on Bloor Street. In 1934 they founded the Canadian Society of Landscape Architects. In 1944 Lorrie became president of this society.

Lorrie caught tuberculosis, which forced her to slow down somewhat after 1928. Lorrie Dunington-Grubb died in Hamilton, Ontario, on 17 January 1945 at the Mountain Sanatorium. Many of the hundreds of gardens have now been lost, although the Parkwood Estate is still well maintained. Landscape Ontario gives an annual Dunington Grubb award.
