= Canadian Society of Landscape Architects =

The Canadian Society of Landscape Architects (French: Association des architectes paysagistes du Canada; CSLA-AAPC) is the national organization representing 1600 landscape architects in Canada's ten provinces and three territories. The organization was founded in 1934. Its mission is to "advance the art, science and business of landscape architecture."

One of the founding members was Lorrie Dunington-Grubb, co-founder with her husband Howard of the Sheridan Nurseries. In 1944 she became president of the society.

== Members of the College of Fellows ==
- Cornelia Oberlander
- Don Vaughan (landscape architect)
- Peter Jacobs (landscape architect)
- Janet Rosenberg
