= Canadian Homes and Gardens =

Canadian magazine (1925–1962)

- Cover of the November 1951 issue
- Categories: Lifestyle
- Frequency: Monthly
- Founded: 1925
- Final issue: 1962
- Company: Maclean-Hunter
- Country: Canada
- Language: English
- ISSN: 0826-2160

Canadian Homes and Gardens was a magazine published by Maclean-Hunter in Canada from 1925 until 1962, succeeded by Canadian Homes, which was published until 1978. It targeted an upper middle class or upper class market, mainly of women, giving advice on home decoration. The distinction between editorial content and advertising was blurred.

== History ==
John Bayne Maclean purchased the magazine in 1925. From then until January 1960 Maclean-Hunter published thirty seven volumes of the magazine. In 1930 Maclean-Hunter published the 242-page Canadian homes and gardens : book of houses. Canadian Homes and Gardens was sold in 1962. It was succeeded by Canadian Homes. The magazine, devoted to interior decoration, was published by Maclean-Hunter until 1978. (Note: One source says that Canadian Homes and Gardens stopped publication in 1960. Others say it was published until 1962. Since several issues from 1962 are cited, 1962 seems correct.)

== Audience ==
Canadian Homes and Gardens targeted urban readers from the upper and upper-middle classes. It competed with U.S. magazines such as Better Homes and Gardens, publishing feature articles on home planning and "gracious living". In the 1920s Canadian Homes and Gardens carried stories and illustrations of developments in furniture and appliance design, including Art Deco styles.

At this time Art Deco was associated with a wealthy elite who want to be seen as modern and cosmopolitan.

During the Great Depression, the magazine painted an upbeat picture when describing the 1933-34 radios, linking them to high culture, adventure and the home:

Many of the new models are equipped with dual-wave equipment, which makes it a simple matter to "go abroad" for the dance music of Paris, London, Cuba, to receive exciting messages from ships at sea, and so on. Modern radio offers a thrilling contact with the whole world—none the less thrilling because it comes in the form of education and amusement, and because it is perhaps the most vital factor, in these times, of binding the family to the home.

Lorrie Dunington-Grubb (1877–1945), a Toronto-based landscape architect who co-founded Sheridan Nurseries, wrote articles on garden design for Canadian Homes and Gardens. The magazine also helped to promote Canadian nationhood through the concept of a popular Canadian culture expressed in terms of residential aesthetics. Thus in July 1929 Canadian Homes and Gardens published an article on a project by the architect Elizabeth Lalor Harding to convert a farmhouse in the Muskoka region into a summer residence. She was interested in developing a Canadian style of architecture. Around 1945 the Greater Vancouver region emerged as a center of architectural modernism, with elegant and innovative designs. This regional style was given extensive coverage in Canadian Homes and Gardens.

== Advertising ==
The boundary between editorial content and advertisements was blurred, since the purpose of the magazine was to help the reader choose what to buy. Articles were complemented by advertisements for related products, and were spread through the magazine. The reader had to work through many pages of advertisements to read an entire article.

The magazine devoted an entire issue to the modernist movement of interior decoration, promoting a show of art moderne by the T. Eaton Company, a chain of department stores. Eaton's College Street was called "one of the few great stores of the world", and was presented as the authority on good taste for middle class urban women. In 1930 an issue of Canadian Homes and Gardens had several pages devoted to the period furniture rooms in the Eaton's College Street store in Toronto. According to the magazine,

In this 20th Century, stores and their merchandise are news. Because of their definite and daily influence upon the lives and the taste of millions, it is essential that the public's buying centres show leadership and a sense of responsibility. Any shop that makes a sincere effort to lead its patrons along the paths of good taste and good values is worthy of consideration.

The magazine avoided controversy. In 1954-55 there was disagreement between the male-dominated National Industrial Design Council and the Consumers' Association of Canada (CAC), whose members were mostly women. The Design Council refused to require performance testing, and routinely gave awards to products that women in the CAC thought were faulty, but refused awards to products the CAC favored. Kathleen Harrison of the CAC wrote an article discussing the issue called "How Good is Design Award Merchandise", but Canadian Homes and Gardens decided not to publish it.

The CAC was given the message that women were expected to accept product designs, not contribute to them.
