= Parkwood Estate =

National Historic Site in Oshawa, Ontario, Canada

Coordinates: 43°54′16″N 78°52′5″W

Parkwood
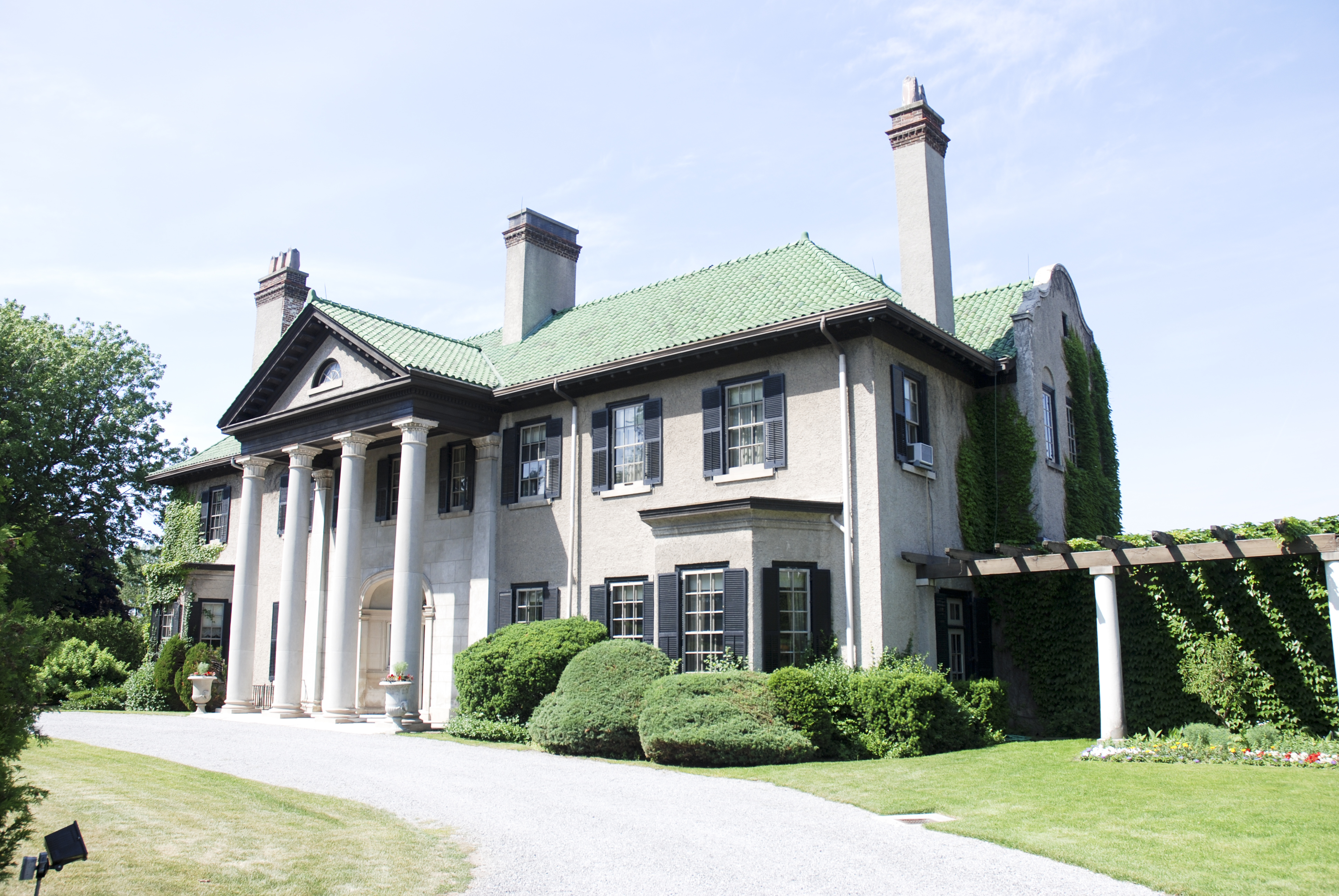
- View toward the front of the house in 2007
- Interactive map of Parkwood
- Location: 270 Simcoe Street North; Oshawa, Ontario, Canada; L1G 4T5

History
- Original use: Residential estate

Site notes
- Current use: Historic house museum
- Website: parkwoodestate.com

National Historic Site of Canada
- Designated: 1989

The Parkwood Estate, located in Oshawa, Ontario, was the residence of Samuel McLaughlin (founder of General Motors of Canada) and was home to the McLaughlin family from 1917 until 1972. The residence was designed by Darling and Pearson, a noted Toronto architectural firm, with construction starting in 1916. In 1989, Parkwood was officially designated a National Historic Site, and tours are now given year-round.

== House ==
Parkwood's architectural, landscape and interior designs are based on those of the 1920s and 1930s. The national Historic Sites and Monuments Board describes it as "a rare surviving example of the type of estate developed in Canada during the inter-war years, and is rarer still by its essentially intact condition, furnished and run to illustrate as it was lived within."

Parkwood was the family home of the McLaughlins from 1917 until 1972. The federal government designated it a National Historic Site in 1989, and it was opened to the public. R.S. McLaughlin was named a National Historic Person that same year.

=== Interior ===
The interiors at Parkwood represent early 20th century design and contain housewares, books, photographs and memorabilia, artwork, and trophies, all displayed in their original settings. Murals include works by Canadian artists Frederick Challener and Frederick Haines. Decorations include carved wood and plaster architectural finishes, as well as novelties such as hidden panels and stairways.

The 55 room mansion has 15,000 square feet (1,400 m^{2}) of space, including the basement and third-floor servants' rooms.

== Gardens ==
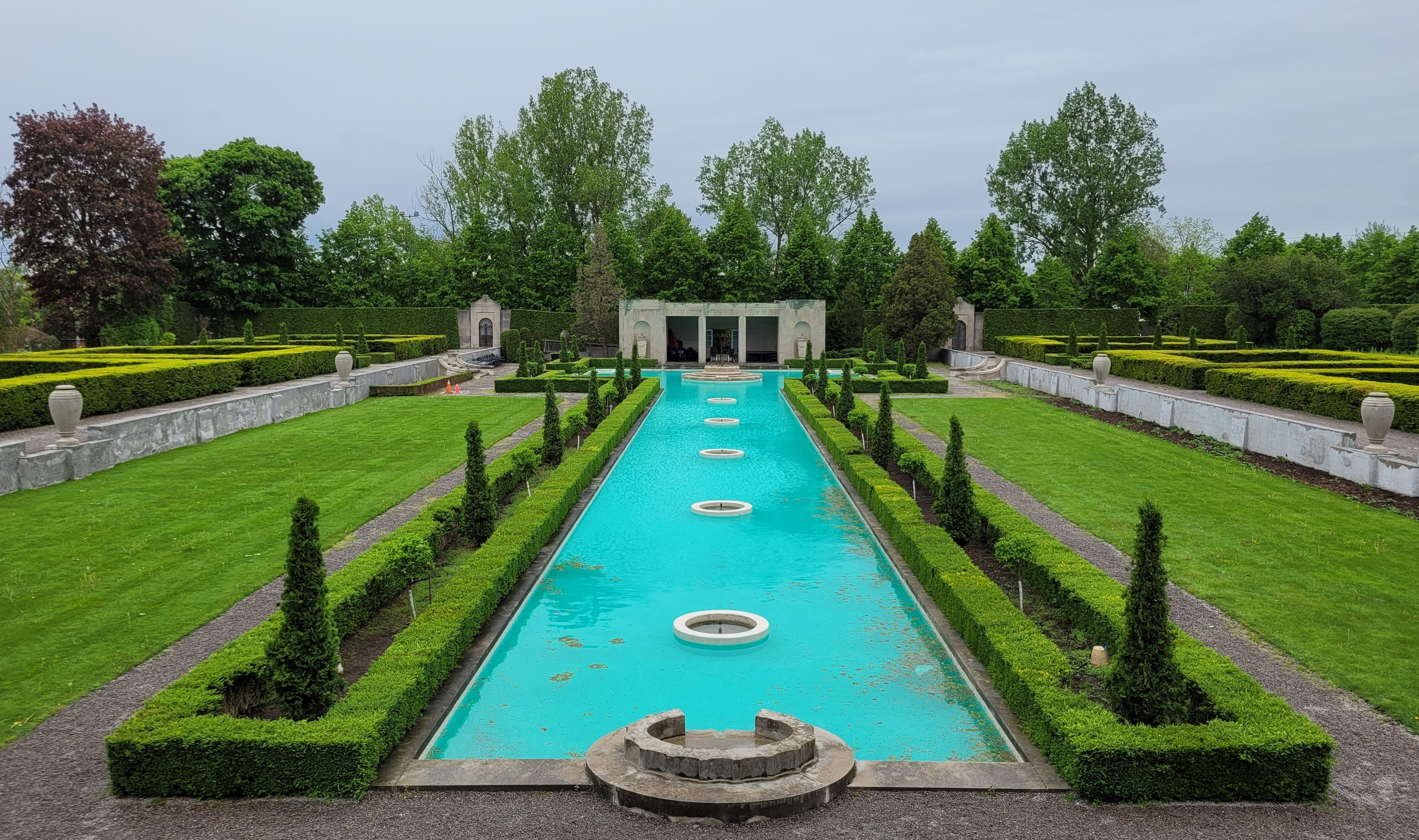
Formal Garden

The McLaughlin family had an avid interest in horticulture and landscaping, as evidenced by their eleven greenhouses and staff of 24 gardeners. McLaughlin sought out the best talent available to create the numerous gardens of his estate – Harries and Hall in the 1910s, the husband and wife team Howard and Lorrie Dunington-Grubb in the 1920s, and award winning architect John Lyle in the 1930s.

The Parkwood gardens have references to the great gardens of England and Europe, but with a 20th-century spirit. Much of the landscape design draws inspiration from the English Arts & Crafts gardening movement. This style called for a high degree of formality near the house, dissolving into less formal presentation with distance from the house, including a broad expanse of immaculate lawn.

The perimeters included denser woodland borders and the use of cedar hedges to sub-divide the landscape into formal garden spaces, recreation areas, and farming space for the production of cut flowers, fruits, and vegetables. The hedges served to prevent the viewing of the entire landscape all at once and were complemented by garden gates beckoning visitors to proceed through a sequence of garden views and experiences.

Shortly after the family took residence in 1917, landscape designers Harries & Hall were engaged to design a fitting setting for the mansion. This was achieved by linking each principal room of the house to a terrace or garden area just outside and finally out into the beautiful wooded park. The site was further refined during the early 1920s by H.B. and L.A. Dunington-Grubb. The husband and wife design team created spectacular outdoor "garden rooms" including the Italian Garden, Sundial Garden, Summer House and the Sunken Garden. They also refined the South Terrace and designed the intricate lattice fencing for the tennis court and Italian Garden. The Dunington-Grubbs were influential in the development of their profession, were the founding members of the Society of Landscape Architects as well as Sheridan Nurseries. Sheridan Nurseries is still thriving today and remain generous supporters of the Parkwood Foundation.

The last of the major additions to the gardens occurred between 1935–1936, with the commission of architect John Lyle to create the Formal Garden. Lyle was awarded the Bronze Medal from the Royal Architectural Institute of Canada for its design. The two-acre garden is in an art moderne style.

Then and now, the gardens are linked by theme and function to the Parkwood greenhouse complex. Three greenhouses are still used for the production of period and specialty plant materials. The greenhouses display palms, orchids, and tropical plants and are home to the Japanese Garden and the Greenhouse Tea Room. Today, the gardens of Parkwood have been restored to represent how they appeared in the 1930s.

== Filming ==
Parkwood's beauty and history provide a backdrop for film work and professional photography. The estate appears regularly as the backdrop in fashion photography and magazine ads, and it is one of Ontario's most popular locations for location filming, arranged by the Ontario Media Development Corporation.

=== Actors who have filmed at Parkwood ===
- Adrien Brody,
- Brendan Fraser,
- Drew Barrymore,
- Tom Cruise,
- Brad Pitt,
- Kathleen Turner,
- Adam Sandler,
- Hugh Laurie,
- Ben Affleck,
- Lucy Liu,
- Tony Shalhoub,
- Alan Alda,
- Eddie Griffin,
- Maureen Stapleton,
- Peter Gallagher,
- Bridgette Wilson-Sampras,
- Diane Lane,
- James Garner,
- Peter O'Toole,
- Jeremy Irons,
- Angela Lansbury,
- Bob Hoskins,
- Jane Seymour,
- Shirley MacLaine,
- Richard Gere,
- Hilary Swank,
- Ewan McGregor,
- Jackie Chan,
- Peter Fonda,
- Julianne Moore,
- Norm Macdonald,
- Darren McGavin,
- Woody Harrelson,
- Laura Dern,
- Jennifer Love Hewitt,
- Kat Dennings,
- Anton Yelchin,
- Christopher Plummer,
- Paul Gross,
- Anne-Marie MacDonald,
- Colm Feore,
- Mike Myers,
- Yannick Bisson,
- Dave Foley
- Bradley Cooper

=== Movies and TV series filmed on premises ===
- 12 Monkeys
- 54
- Amelia
- America's Castles
- American Gothic (2016 TV series)
- Anne of Green Gables: The Continuing Story
- Bailey's Billion$
- Billy Madison
- Bomb Girls
- The Boys
- The Boys
- Bulletproof Monk
- Canadian Bacon
- Charles and Diana: Unhappily Ever After
- Chicago
- Charlie Bartlett
- Cine Nova, The story of James Bond
- Covert Affairs, episodes in 2012
- Cow Belles
- Doom Patrol
- The Expanse
- Feast of All Saints
- Fever Pitch
- The Gathering
- Global Heresy
- G-Spot
- Hollywoodland
- Housecapades with Mike Bullard
- Hemlock Grove
- Hide And Seek
- Impossible Heists
- The Kennedys
- Killjoys
- Life with Judy Garland: Me and My Shadows
- The Last Don
- Marry Me
- Monk
- Mrs. Winterbourne
- Murder in a Small Town
- Murder in the Hamptons
- Murdoch Mysteries
- Nature of the Beast
- A Nero Wolfe Mystery ("Motherhunt")
- Prizewinner of Defiance, Ohio, The
- Queer as Folk
- Ready or Not
- Ref, The
- Relic Hunter
- RFK
- Rich Bride/Poor Bride
- Rita MacNeil's Christmas Special
- Seeing Things (TV series)
- Self Made
- The State Within
- Shadowhunters
- Star Trek: Strange New Worlds
- Tuxedo, The
- Twitches Too
- Transporter: The Series
- Trump Unauthorized
- Undercover Brother
- The Umbrella Academy
- Warehouse 13
- X-Men
- Nightmare Alley
