= Lam Wong =

Vancouver based artist Lam Wong

Lam Wong (born 1968) is a Canadian visual artist, designer, and curator, whose art has been a substantial part of significant exhibitions in Vancouver. His works are primarily rooted in regional West Coast art history, with an emphasis on the development of painting and its avant-garde narrative. Lam’s creative approach is often concerned with blending Eastern philosophies and challenging the notion of painting.

== Background ==
Lam Wong was born in Xiamen, China and immigrated to Hong Kong when he was in grade two, eventually immigrating to Canada during the 1980s. He has lived and worked in Vancouver, British Columbia since 1998. He studied design, art history, and painting, both in Alberta and British Columbia. His practice revolves around painting and tea related artwork as his main media. Wong sees art making as an ongoing spiritual practice and around the perception of reality, the meaning of art, and the relationships between time, memory, and space.

== Exhibitions ==
Lam Wong has exhibited work at the Vancouver Art Gallery, Centre A Vancouver International Centre for Contemporary Asian Art, Dr Sun Yat-Sen Classical Chinese Garden, and Griffin Art Project.

=== Selected solo exhibitions ===
- 2022 - Lam Wong: Ghosts from Underground Love - (Canton-sardine)
- 2020 - The World Is As Soft As A Volcano: A Moving Composition - (Center A Vancouver International Centre for Contemporary Asian Art)
- 2019 - Perso/ne - (Griffin Art Project)
- 2019 - Lam Wong: Mind Transition (Canton-sardine)
- 2014 - Lam Wong: 21 Elements (Arts Council Gallery)

=== Selected group exhibitions ===
- 2021 - Look Towards The Sun: Lawrence Paul Yuxweluptun + Lam Wong (Dr. Sun Yat-Sen Classical Chinese Garden), Curated by Sarah Ling
- 2021 - Vancouver Special: Disorientations and Echo - (Vancouver Art Gallery)
- 2021 - Rivers Have Mouths - Indigenous + Chinese Canadian Art Exchange - (Dr. Sun Yat-Sen Classical Chinese Garden), with Kelly Cannell (ʔəy̓xʷatəna:t) / Angela George (qʷənat) / Laiwan (朱麗雲) / Sarah Ling (凌慧意) / Lam Wong (王藝林) / Cease Wyss (T’uy’t’tanat) / Xwalacktun (Rick Harry)
- 2019 - CHAJI / 茶寂 (Dr. Sun Yat-Sen Classical Chinese Garden)

=== Selected curated exhibitions ===
- 2023 - Jeff Wall: Views in and out of Vancouver (canton-sardine)
- 2020 - Investigation of Things 格物 (Dr. Sun Yat-Sen Classical Chinese Garden)
- 2019 - CHAJI / 茶寂 (Dr. Sun Yat-Sen Classical Chinese Garden)

== Bibliography ==
In the Present Moment: Buddhism, Contemporary Art and Social Practice (2022) by Haema Sivanesan ( ISBN 978-1773271644)
