= Cullen Gardens and Miniature Village =

Tourist attraction in Ontario, Canada

Coordinates: 43.9150°N 78.9664°W

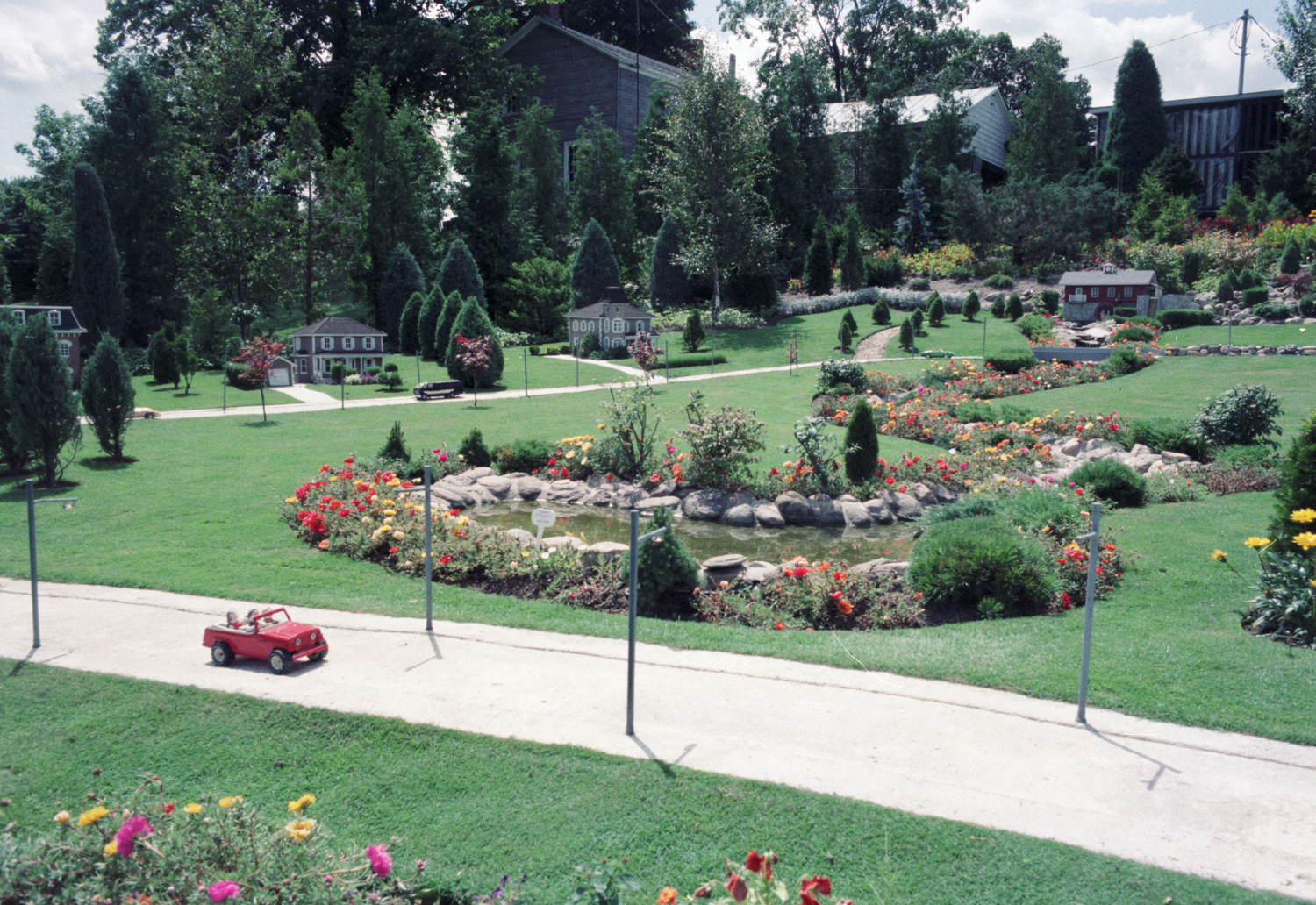
Cullen Garden and Miniature Village

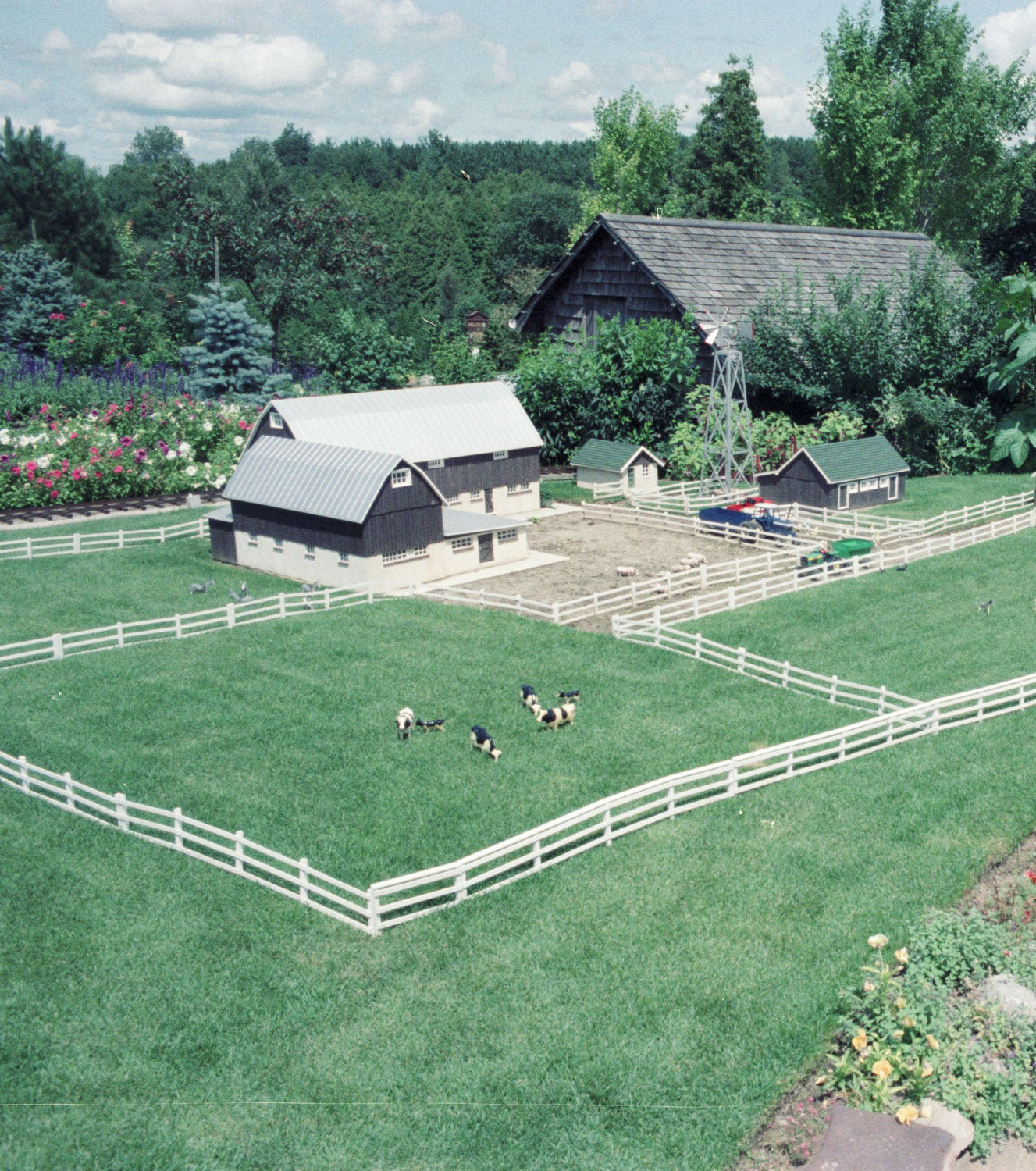
A model farm in the village

Cullen Gardens & Miniature Village was a popular tourist attraction in Whitby, Ontario, Canada. Officially opened in May 1980 by founder Len Cullen and his wife Connie, the Gardens were a major tourist attraction in Whitby for 25 years.

== Features and attractions ==
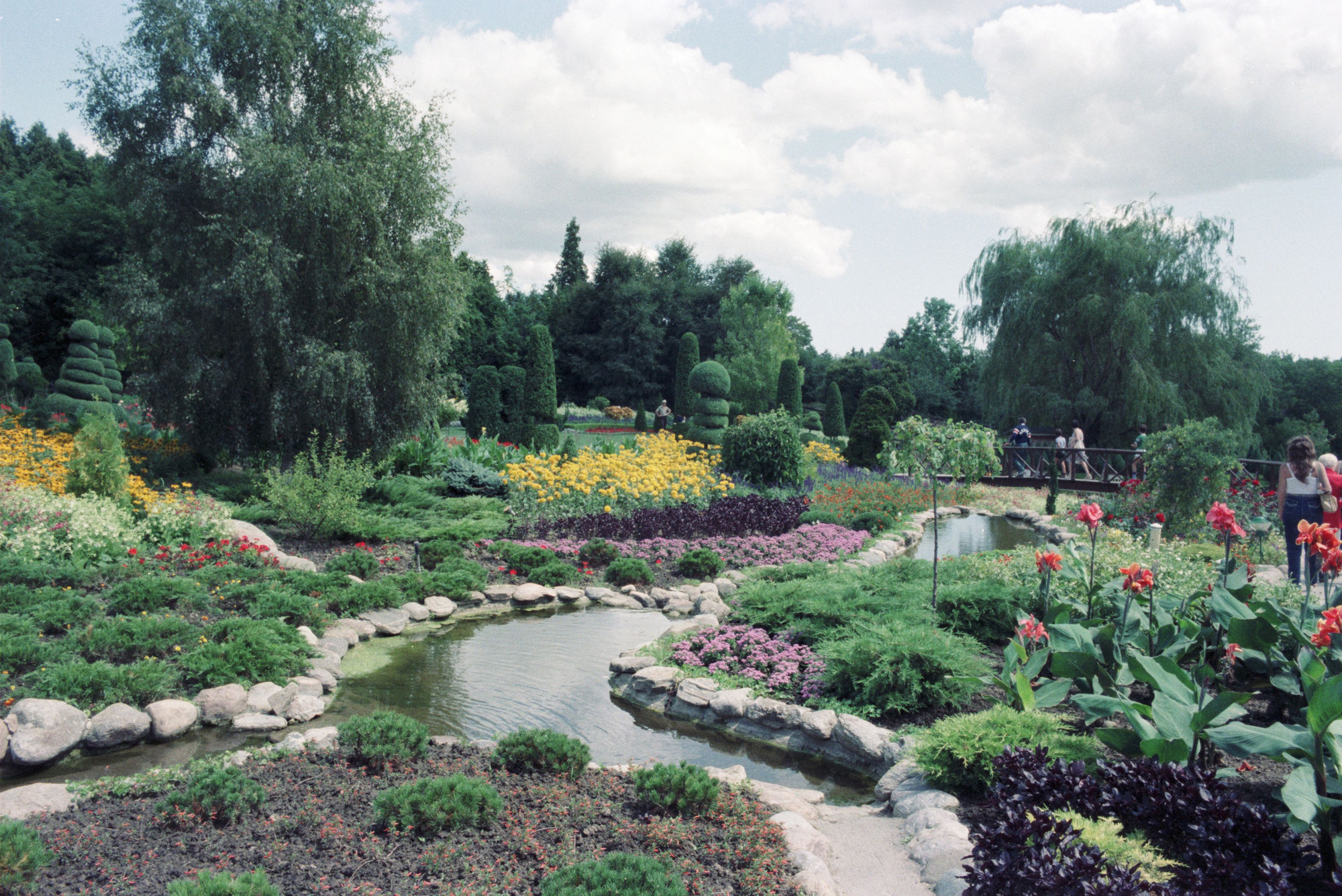
Cullen Gardens

Cullen Gardens combined the natural beauty of floral displays and gardens, along with a unique southern Ontario-themed miniature village. The miniature village included many houses and trains that would travel around and between the houses. Other features included radio-controlled miniature boats. It was an entertaining attraction for both children and adults. In 1983, the Miniature Village served as the filming location for an episode of the Canadian television series The Littlest Hobo, entitled "Small Pleasures" (season 4, episode 16).

During the Winter holiday season, Cullen Gardens was host to the Festival of Lights, which featured huge displays of Christmas lights throughout the grounds, often decorating large topiaries.

== Closure and redevelopment ==
On 1 January 2006, Cullen Gardens and Miniature Village closed. The land, however, has since been purchased by the Town of Whitby, to remain in the public domain as a municipal park. There has been speculation that the property may link up with the Heber Down conservation area. At the time of its closure, the park was co-owned by Sue Cullen-Green and Bryan Green.

The miniature Village no longer exists at the site and the model buildings were sold to the nearby City of Oshawa for $234,000. Oshawa later put them up for sale again rather than opening an attraction of its own, citing budgetary austerity. The golf course formerly attached to Cullen Gardens has ceased to operate

The miniature buildings were purchased by the Niagara Parks Commission in 2012. Many of the miniature buildings are now on display at the NPC's Botanical Gardens in Niagara Falls, Ontario.

In November 2011, the Town entered into a purchase and sale agreement with Auberge et Spa Le Nordik Inc. of Chelsea, Quebec. Le Nordik bought the main building and 3 hectares of land. They intend to use the main building and outdoor area to build a year-round heat therapy spa with two restaurants, a retail boutique and a small conference area. The remaining land was designated as open space and parkland, known as Cullen Central Park. The deal closed in 2013 and the spa was supposed to open in 2015.

On October 6, 2022, Thermëa spa opened on the site, after multiple delays.

== See also ==
- Pocket Planet Canada
