= Don Vaughan (landscape architect) =

American landscape architect

Don W. Vaughan
- Born: June 21, 1937 (age 89); Coos Bay, Oregon
- Education: University of Oregon; Emily Carr Institute
- Occupations: Landscape architect and artist
- Years active: 1965 – present
- Notable work: Dr. Sun Yat-Sen Classical Chinese Garden

Don W. Vaughan RCA (born June 21, 1937) is an American landscape architect based in Vancouver, British Columbia, Canada.

== Biography ==
Vaughan was born into a family involved in the timber industry in Coos Bay, Oregon, United States. His grandfather owned a logging company called Coos Bay Logging.

In 1965, Vaughan received his bachelor's degree in landscape architecture from the University of Oregon. In 1971, he established the firm Don Vaughan & Associates. In 1974, he became the consulting campus landscape architect for the University of Victoria in Canada, a role in which he continued until 2008. During the late 1980s, Vaughan left landscape architecture and focused on fine arts, receiving a fine arts degree from the Emily Carr Institute of Art and Design in Vancouver in 1989. In 2001, the company name was changed to Vaughan Landscape Planning and Design and Vaughan's two sons, Mark and Jeff, joined the firm. He is an adjunct professor of the University of British Columbia's School of Architecture and Landscape Architecture.

== Designs ==
Vaughan's park designs are often inspired by the Millicoma River in Coos County, Oregon where he spent his childhood summers. These designs incorporate still ponds, waterfalls, and granite sculptures.

One of Vaughan's more ambitious landscapes is the 1986 Dr. Sun Yat-Sen Classical Chinese Garden in Vancouver, where he and architect Joe Wai took ten years to persuade three levels of government and private donors to fund the project, which cost $6.1 million.

== Awards ==
An honorary Doctor of Laws (LL.D.) degree was awarded to him by the University of Victoria in the Fall 2007 convocation. He is a Fellow of the American Society of Landscape Architects (ASLA) as well as the Canadian Society of Landscape Architects, and is a member of the Royal Canadian Academy of Arts. Vaughan's 2005 ASLA Fellow nomination profile noted:

For the past 40 years Don Vaughan has been the face of landscape architecture in Vancouver and much of Western Canada. It is no exaggeration to say that by the sheer number, size, and significance of his projects he has influenced the urban fabric of Vancouver, contributing to the scenic and cosmopolitan city that we know today. Through his work and his energy on design teams and review boards, Don has been a design leader and innovator, rallying the design professions—architects, landscape architects and planners—on major projects to his higher vision of what is possible. His legacy is impressive, including countless projects enjoyed by millions and an undeniable influence on the landscape architecture profession in Vancouver.

== Other projects ==
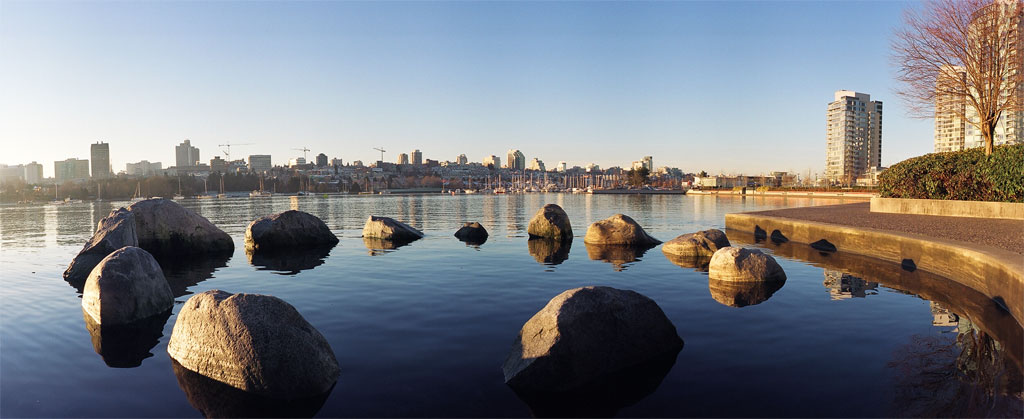
Waiting for Low Tide in David Lam Park

- Ambleside Park, Granite Assemblage, Ambleside, West Vancouver
- Bentall Centre and the Burrard Street ALRT Station, Art Phillips Park (formerly Discovery Square), Downtown Vancouver
- David Lam Park, Marking High Tide and Waiting for Low Tide, Yaletown, Vancouver
- Metrotown Civic Plaza, Metrotown Shopping Center, Burnaby, British Columbia
- Sun Life Plaza, Vancouver
- University of Victoria, Victoria, British Columbia
- Whistler Village, Whistler, British Columbia
