= Peter Jacobs (landscape architect) =

Canadian landscape architect

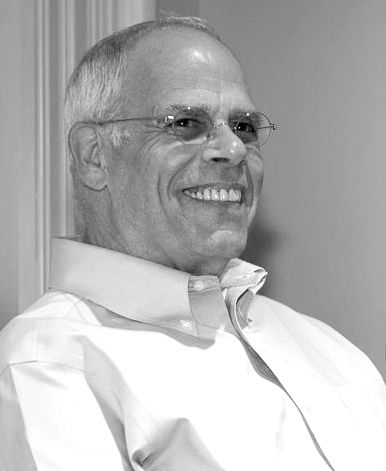
- Born: 3 December 1939 (age 86); Montreal, Quebec, Canada
- Occupations: professor, landscape architect
- Employer: Université de Montréal

Peter Daniel Alexander Jacobs CM RCA (born 3 December 1939) is a Canadian landscape architect specializing in the conservation and development of rural and northern landscapes and in urban landscape design. He is Emeritus professor of the School of Planning and Landscape Architecture of the Universite de Montreal, Emeritus Chair of the Commission on Environmental Planning of the International Union for the conservation of nature (IUCN), Past President of the Canadian Society of Landscape Architects (CSLA), Chair of the Kativik Environmental Quality Commission (from 1979) and a Member of the Royal Canadian Academy of the Arts.

== Biography ==
Jacobs was born in Montreal on 3 December 1939. His parents were both natives of New York City: Jacob Joseph Jacobs graduated from New York University as a chemical engineer and Francis Alexander graduated from Barnard College in ancient languages. His interest in nature and the landscape was nurtured during summer family trips to the ocean and others in the northern boreal forest. His commitment to the urban landscape was derived from his experience of the cultural diversity and convivial social energy of Montreal. He is married to Ellen Vineberg Jacobs, distinguished professor emerita of Concordia University in Montreal.

Jacobs graduated from Antioch College with a bachelor's degree (1961) in engineering and fine arts. He continued his studies at the Harvard Graduate School of Design, where he obtained a Masters of Architecture degree (1964) followed by a Master of Landscape Architecture degree (1968). He then pursued a program of special studies in human ecology at Dalhousie University, Nova Scotia.

Following his studies, Jacobs pursued both an academic and professional career. After first practicing architecture, he concentrated on landscape planning and urban design. In 1971 he was promoted to associate professor and in 1979 to full professor in the School of Landscape Architecture, Universite de Montreal. He was the school's first director (1978) and the first associate dean of research of the Faculte de l’Amenagement (1977–1984). He was named Emeritus professor in 2016.

Peter Jacobs is Fellow and past president of the Canadian Society of Landscape Architects (CSLA) (1978–1980), Fellow of the American Society of Landscape Architects (ASLA), and served as the Canadian delegate to the International Federation of Landscape Architects (IFLA) (1986–1995). In 2016, he was named Chair of the Montreal Heritage Council and member of the Order of Canada .

== Main achievements and contributions ==
=== Pedagogical development of a new field of studies ===
Jacobs' teaching is based on the structure and meaning of the urban and rural landscape as well as the use of criteria such as belonging, equity, and integrity in the design of landscape form. Due to his expertise, Peter Jacobs has been invited to evaluate numerous academic programs in Canada, Israel, Columbia, France, China and Spain. He has also given intensive courses and design studios in more than 50 universities around the world.

His research and community activities have focused on the sustainable and equitable development and conservation of the landscape in association with the International Union for the Conservation of Nature (IUCN), with the Kativik Environmental Quality Commission as Chair of the commission (KEQC) since 1979, and as Chair of the Public Advisory Council for the Canadian State of the Environment Report (1991).

=== Early stages of environmental evaluation ===
Jacobs was one of the early participants in a variety of environmental evaluation formats related to urban development and the North, both as a chair and a member of numerous public commissions. He chaired the public consultation process on the future of Lancaster Sound in the Canadian arctic (1980) and has Chaired the Kativik Environmental Quality Commission in Nunavik (since 1981). He also co-Chaired the public hearings related to the environmental impacts of the Great Whale Hydoelectric Project flowing into James Bay, Quebec (1992–1994).

In the urban context, he has participated as a commissioner for the Bureau de consultation de Montreal and the Office de consultation Publique de Montreal on files related to the development of urban neighborhoods, urban infrastructure, and the planning and design of large metropolitan parks and nature reserves.

In 1990, as a member of the Canadian Environmental Assessment Research Council (CEARC), he co-edited and was one of the chief architects of a research report on Sustainable Development and Environmental Assessment : Perspectives on Planning for a Common Future. Internationally, he has served as a consultant for programs sponsored by UNESCO, MAB, UNU, and IUCN.

=== Relationship of landscape and culture ===
One of the principal research fields developed by Jacobs is linked to the impact of culture and cultural values to the perception and management of landscapes. Numerous international missions in Africa, Latin America, Australia, and Europe as well as the arctic landscapes of Northern Quebec have provided a rich array of conditions and experiences that contribute to a diversity of cultural perspectives as to how the landscape is perceived and managed.

His prolonged research visits to Dumbarton Oaks as chair of the Senior Fellows of the Landscape and Garden Studies program and subsequently as Beatrix Farrand Distinguished Fellow provided further material with which to evaluate the diverse cultural visions of the landscape.

=== Community service ===
Jacobs' commitment to the community is marked by his desire to integrate professional practice with academic research in the service of community growth and development. As chair of the Environmental Planning Commission from 1978 to 1990, he helped formulate nature conservation programs and action plans for numerous countries. His environmental activities have focused on nature conservancy, the preservation of urban open space, and the development of policy, programs, and plans in support of equitable and sustainable development.

He has served as vice-president of the Solomon Schecter Academy (1973–1976), advisor to the Society for the Protection of Nature in Israel, member of the intercultural advisory committee of the City of Montreal, and president of the Jewish Public Library of Montreal(1996–2000) He has also served as Chair of the community planning and allocations committee and as a Director of the Federation of Jewish Community Agencies, the United Israel Agencies of Canada and the Canadian Jewish National Fund and is an Officer of the Shaar Hashomayim Synagogue, Westmount, Quebec.

== Prizes and distinctions ==
- 2020 : Appointed as a member of the Order of Canada.
- 2020 : Governor General’s Medal in Landscape Architecture

This list comes from the research portal of the Université de Montréal

- 2016 : Emeritus professor, Université de Montreal, Faculté de l’aménagement
- 2015 : Member, Royal Canadian Academy of the Arts
- 2013 : Frederick G. Todd Prize, Quebec association of landscape architects
- 2013 : Key stone Prize, Founder, Heritage Montreal
- 2010 : A Story Garden, Design Prize, The arts and the city, City of Montreal
- 2009 : The Mont-Royal Prize, Friends of the Mountain and City of Montreal
- 2008 : Inaugural Beatrix Farrand Distinguished Fellow, Dunbarton Oaks, Harvard University, Washington DC, Landscape and Garden design
- 2008 : Teaching Award, Canadian Society of landscape architects
- 2007 : Distinguished service award, Federation CJA, Montreal
- 1998 : Honorary member, Columbian society of landscape architects
- 1994 : President's prize, Canadian society of landscape architects
- 1994 : Regional Award, design excellence, Faubourg Quebec, CSLA, in association with P. Poullaouec-Gonidec and Bernard St. Denis
- 1993 : Gouvenor General of Canada Prize commemorating the 125th Anniversary of Confederation
- 1993 : Regional Award, design excellence, Place Berri, Montreal. CSLA, in association with P. Poullaouec-Gonidec and Bernard St. Denis
- 1992 : Special Prize, Order of Architects of Quebec, Place Berri, Montreal
- 1990 : Elected Fellow, American Society of Landscape Architects
- 1988 : A.H. Tammsaare Prize, Eastern European Committee, IUCN
- 1986 : Elected Fellow of the Canadian Society of Landscape Architects

== Selected publications ==
This list comes from the research portal of the Université de Montréal

=== Books et collections ===
- 2009 : Jacobs, Peter; Nunavik : Un environnement en évolution : Une évaluation environnementale et sociale du développement nordique 1979–2009; Commission de la qualité de l’environnement Kativik, Kuujjuaq. Avec Daniel Berrouard et Mireille Paul
- 2000 : Jacobs, Peter et Foisy Oswald (2000); Les Quatre Saisons du Mont Royal; Méridien, Montréal; 140 p.
- 1987 : Jacobs, Peter & Munro, David, eds. Conservation with Equity: Strategies for Sustainable Development; Proceedings of the Ottawa Conference on Implementing the World Conservation Strategy, IUCN. 466 p.
- 1986 : Jacobs, Peter & Châtignier, Hervé. Ed. Proceedings of the Kativik Environment Conference, Kujuuak, QC. Kativik Regional Government; Editions Boulard; 319 p.
- 1985 : Jacobs, Peter, ed.. "Environmental Planning and Management for Sustainable Development"; Special Issue of Landscape Planning. Elsevier Scientific Publishing Co., Amsterdam, 1985, 110 p.
- 1983 : Jacobs, Peter et Robert, Francine, éd. Stratégie de conservation de l'eau, Colloque international tenu à la Ville de Québec, juin 1981, mars 1983, 418 p.
- 1981 : Jacobs, Peter, Environmental Strategy and Action: The Challenge of the World Conservation Strategy, University of British Columbia Press, Vancouver, 99 p.
- 1981: Jacobs, Peter, "Population, ressources et environnement, Étude régionale du Détroit de Lancaster, Affaires indiennes et du Nord Canada, 69 p.
- 1979 : Jacobs, Peter, ed. "Canada: Landscape Planning for People". Landscape Planning, Vol. 6, no. 2, August, Elsevier Scientific Publishing, Amsterdam, 153 p.

=== Book chapters ===
- 2013 : Jacobs, Peter; Modern Garden Types; in: A Cultural History of Gardens in the Modern Age; John Dixon Hunt and Michael Leslie, eds. Bloomsbury Publishing; London
- 2007 : Jacobs, Peter; Echoes, F. Parade : Fernando Chacel's Gardens in the coastal Plain of Jacarepaguà; Contemporary Garden Aesthetics, Creations and Interpretations; Harvard Press and Dumbarton Oaks, Spring
- 2007 : Heyes, S. and Jacobs, P.; "Loosing [sic?] Place : Diminishing Knowledge of the Arctic Coastal Landscape"; in : Different Takes on Place; F. Vaudary, J. Malpas, M. Higgins eds.; The National Museum of Canberra, Australia, Spring
- 1994 : Jacobs, Peter; Bouchard, Michel and Lépine, Brigitte. To leave as much and as good; in Keeping Ahead : the inclusion of long term futures in Environmental Impact Assessment, R.E. Munn, Editor; Institute of Environmental Studies, Toronto
- 1990 Sadler, Barry and Jacobs, Peter; A Key to Tomorrow: on the relationship of environmental assessment and sustainable development; in: Sustainable Development and environmental assessment; CCEARC, Ottawa
- 1989 : Jacobs, Peter; The magic mountain; An urban landscape for the next millennium; in: Grass roots, Greystones, and Glass Towers; Brian Demchinsky, ed.; Vehicle Press, Montreal
- 1988 : Jacobs, Peter. Towards a network of knowing and of planning in the Canadian North; In: Knowing the North, William Wonders, ed., Boreal Institute for Northern Studies; Edmonton, Alberta
- 1984 : Jacobs, Peter. The Lancaster Sound Regional Study, in Culture and Conservation : The Human Dimensionin Environmental Planning, J.A. McNeely and D. Pitt, Editors, Croom Helm; London, 65-80
- 1984 : Jacobs, Peter. Environmental Planning and Rational Use; in : Sustaining Tomorrow: A Strategy for World Conservation and Development, Thibodeau & Field Ed; U. Press of New England, Hanover and London, 77-85

=== Professional commissions and exhibitions ===
- 2012 : Landscape Theory and Practice: An online course developed for the Royal Architecture Institute of Canada in collaboration with the University of Athabasca.
- 2000 : Re-imaging Champlain Boulevard, A landscape strategy for the Ministry of Transport and the National Capital Commission of Quebec.
- 1996 : An evaluation and strategic development plan for the Botanical Gardens, Parks and Scientific equipment Service of Montreal
- 1994 : Consultant, Berri Metro station, Montreal, Transportation Commission In collaboration with Jacques Rousseau and P. Poullaouec-Gonidec
- 1993 : Member, Expert committee for the redesign of the Expo 67 Islands Parks Service, City of Montreal
- 1993 : Consultant for the redesign of Rene-Levesque Boulevard and Dufferin, City of Quebec, National Capital Commission of Quebec
- 1992 : Concept, program and initial design, Place Berri, Parks service of Montreal.
- 1991 : Consultant, Design criteria for a new Haute Etudes Commercial complex, Universite de Montreal, in association with Jean-Claude Marsan, John MacLeod, P. Poullaoeuc-Gonidec and Bernard St. Denis
