= Landscape Ontario =

Landscape Ontario Horticultural Trades Association
- Company type: Association
- Industry: Horticulture
- Founded: Toronto, Ontario (1973)
- Headquarters: Halton Hills, Ontario
- Website: landscapeontario.com

Landscape Ontario Horticultural Trades Association, or simply Landscape Ontario, is an association representing the horticultural industry in Ontario. It serves 10 related sectors of horticulture and has more than 2,000 member companies.

It was founded in 1973 by combining three separate horticultural associations into one: Ontario Garden Maintenance and Landscape Association, Ontario Landscape Contractors Association, and Ontario Nurseryman's Association. The founding President was Glenn Peister of McLean-Peister Limited in Kitchener.

== Organization ==
The association is governed by an elected Provincial Board of Directors. The current president of the board is David Wright, owner of Wright Landscape Services in Bloomingdale Ontario.

== Chapters ==
Landscape Ontario's membership is organized by a chapter system.

- Durham
- Georgian Lakelands
- Golden Horseshoe
- London
- Ottawa
- Toronto
- Upper Canada
- Waterloo
- Windsor

== Exhibitions ==
Landscape Ontario started its January trade show Congress in 1973. The show is now in the top five horticultural shows in North America with over 8 acres (32,000 m^{2}) of exhibits plus 12,500 trade visitors. In 2003, a secondary fall buying show was created called Garden Expo. Over the years this show has merged with other like minded shows like the National Hardware Show and continually partners up with Flowers Canada which changed the shows name to Garden and Floral Expo. To alleviate confusion, the show is now known as Landscape Ontario's Expo.

Landscape Ontario and the Garden Club of Toronto founded Canada Blooms in 1996 as a consumer show.
