= Dr. Sun Yat-Sen Classical Chinese Garden =

Chinese garden in Vancouver, British Columbia

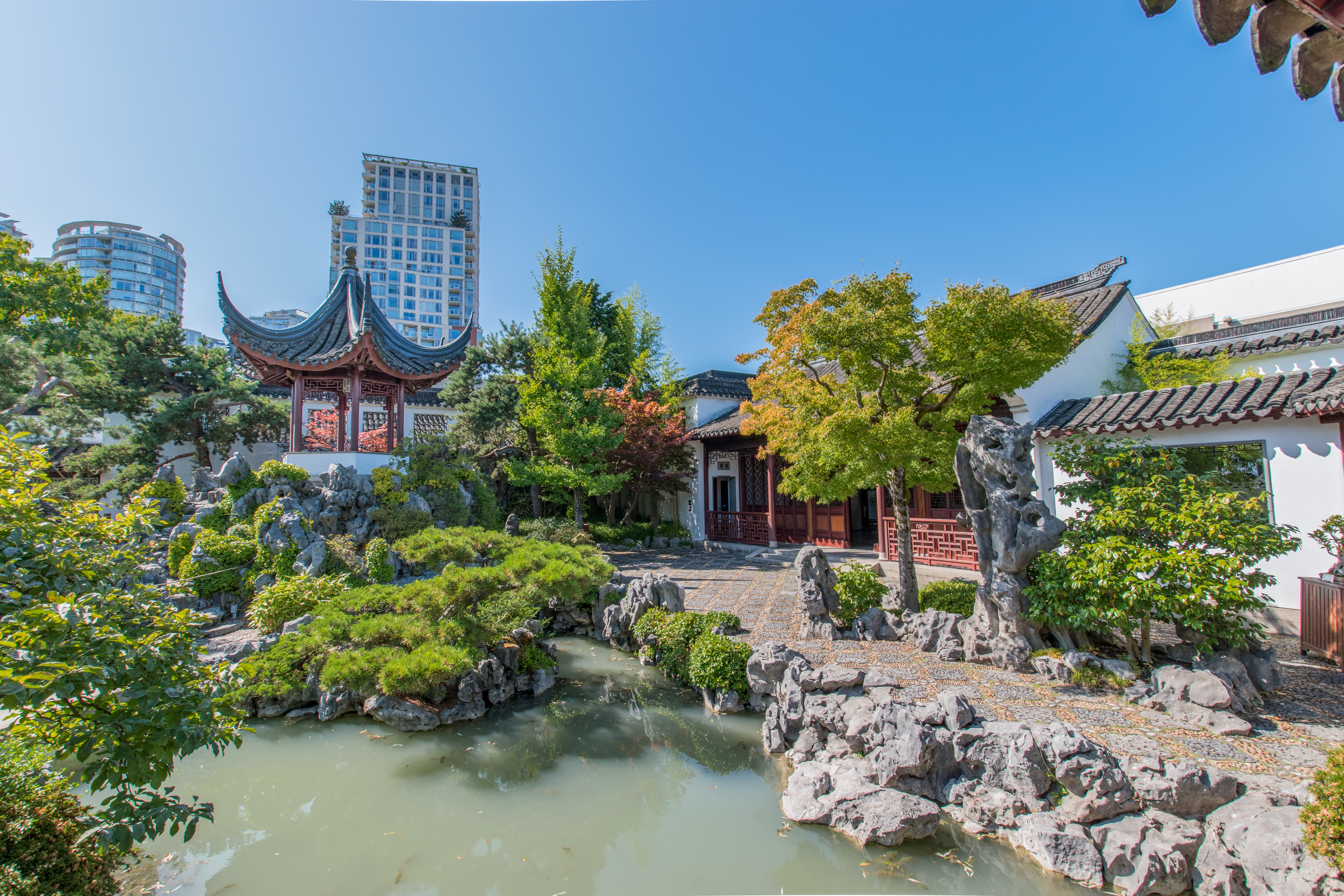
- Interactive map of Dr. Sun Yat-Sen Classical Chinese Garden
- Type: Non-profit charity
- Location: 578 Carrall Street; Vancouver, British Columbia; V6B 5K2
- Coordinates: 49.279551°N 123.103416°W
- Area: 0.3 acres (0.12 ha)
- Created: 1986
- Website: vancouverchinesegarden.com

National Historic Site of Canada
- Official name: Dr. Sun Yat-Sen Classical Chinese Garden and Park
- Designated: January 13, 2016
- Reference no.: 20664

Chinese name
- Traditional Chinese: 中山公園
- Simplified Chinese: 中山公园
Transcriptions
Standard Mandarin
- Hanyu Pinyin: Zhōngshān Gōngyuán
Yue: Cantonese
- Jyutping: Zung^{1}saan^{1} Gung^{1}jyun^{4}
other Yue
- Taishanese: Zuung^{1}san^{1} Guung^{1}yon^{3*}

The Dr. Sun Yat-Sen Classical Chinese Garden (Chinese: 中山公園; lit. 'Zhongshan Park') is a Chinese garden in Vancouver, British Columbia, Canada. Located in the city's Chinatown, it was the first Chinese garden built outside of Asia. It is located at 578 Carrall Street and consists of a freely accessible public park and a garden with an admission fee. The mandate of the garden is to "maintain and enhance the bridge of understanding between Chinese and western cultures, promote Chinese culture generally and be an integral part of the local community."

== History ==
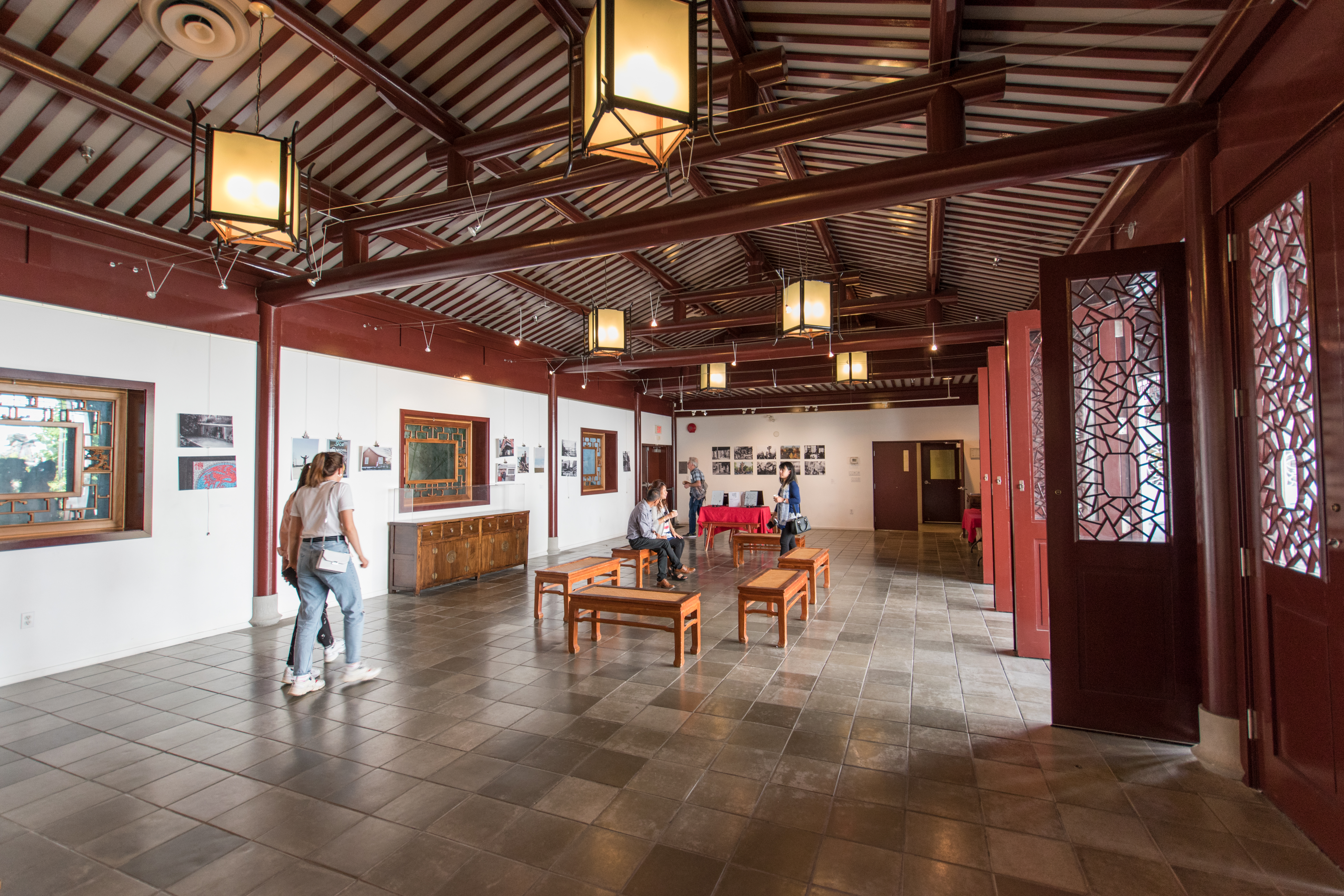
Hall of One Hundred Rivers

The garden was built in 1985–1986. The outer park was designed by architects Joe Wai and Donald Vaughan, while the inner garden was conceived by Wang Zu-Xin as the chief architect, with the help of experts from the Landscape Architecture Company of Suzhou, China. Funding for the project came from the Chinese and Canadian governments, the local Chinese community, and other public and private sector sources, and it opened on April 24, 1986, in time for Expo 86. The garden was built on what used to be fill-in land for rail industries like the BC Electric Railway and Great Northern Railway of Canada.

Because the winter climate in Vancouver is similar to that of Suzhou, many of the same plant varieties are found in the garden as in its Suzhou counterparts. The plants were chosen according to their blossom schedules in order to emphasize seasonal changes, especially the "awakening" in spring. They are also selected to invoke the symbolic, historical, and literary meaning of each plant and are used sparingly, in contrast to western gardens, and provide colour through all the seasons.

Classical Chinese gardens employ philosophical principles of Feng shui and Taoism, striving to achieve harmony and a balance of opposites. Craggy rocks, for example, are juxtaposed against delicate foliage. Water is also an important element of the garden, and the large pond offers stillness, sound, a reflection of the sky, and helps to unify the other elements. Fish and turtles live in the garden and also serve a symbolic purpose. Bats, dragons, and phoenixes are represented in objects throughout the garden. Numerous large rocks are strategically placed and are intended to represent mountains concealing and revealing park elements.

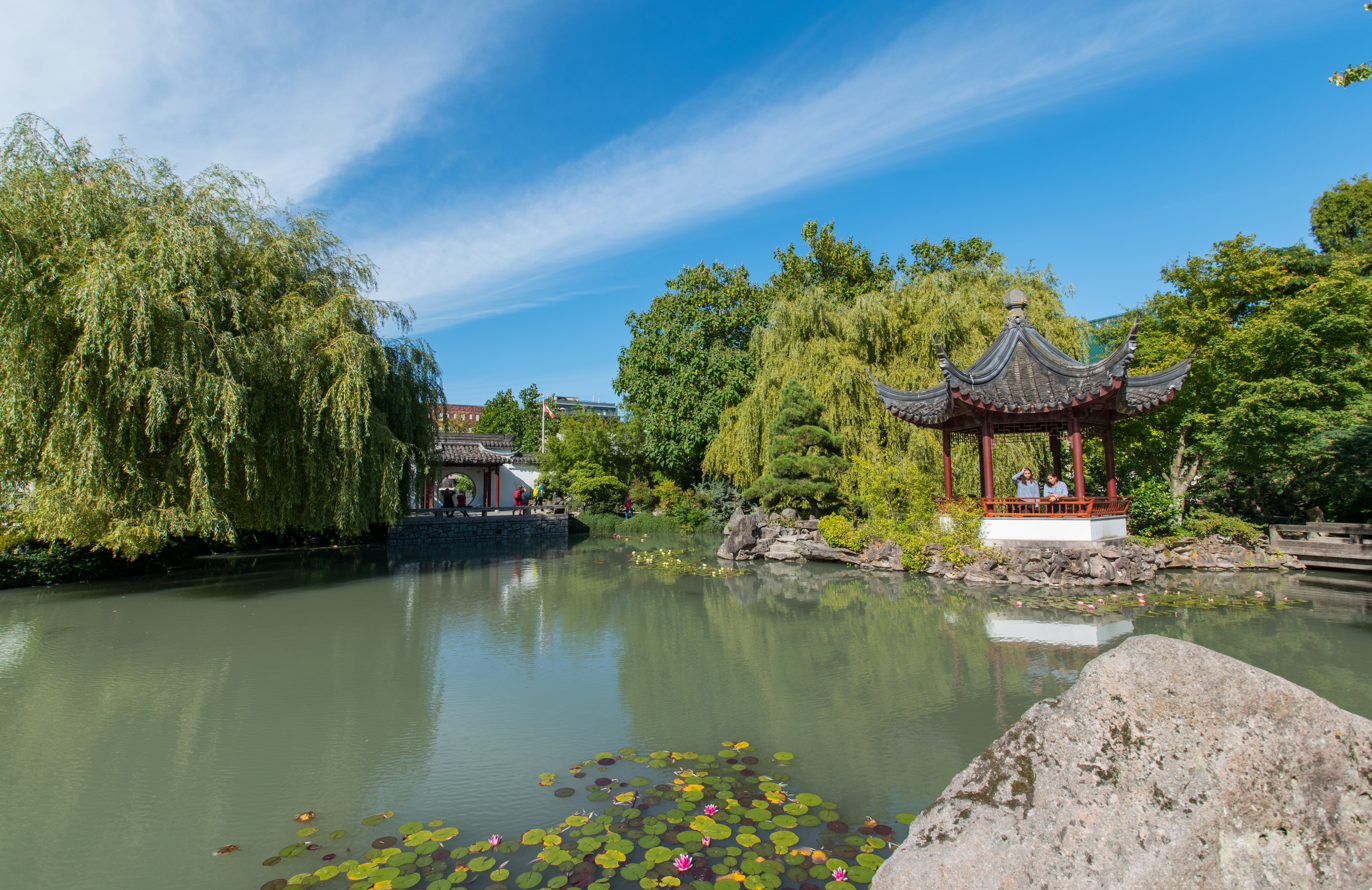
Dr. Sun Yat-Sen Park

The garden is named in honour of Dr. Sun Yat-Sen, a nationalist leader who is considered the "father of modern China." The attribution is not arbitrary, as it emphasizes his connection with Vancouver. While traveling the world to raise awareness of, and funding for, the Chinese nationalist movement, Sun Yat-Sen stayed in Vancouver on three occasions for extended periods. At the time, there was a significant presence of Chinese nationalists in British Columbia, who helped finance the Xinhai Revolution that overthrew the Qing dynasty in 1911. Sun Yat Sen subsequently became the first president of the Republic of China.

The Dr. Sun Yat-Sen Park and Dr. Sun Yat-Sen Classical Chinese Garden are two separate entities, linked by the artificial pond. While the Dr. Sun Yat-Sen Classical Chinese Garden is all of the above, the Dr. Sun Yat-Sen Park is a public park built in a Chinese style, with mostly North American materials.

== In popular culture ==
The Dr. Sun Yat-Sen Classical Chinese Garden was used as the backdrop for many episodes of Season 4 of Falling Skies. The Garden also appears in the 2000 film Romeo Must Die starring Jet Li and Aaliyah, as well as in Season 5 Episode 1 of Psych, titled "Romeo and Juliet and Juliet". The Garden was also the site of a calligraphy task during the second episode of The Amazing Race Canada 1.

== See also ==
- List of botanical gardens in Canada
- List of Chinese gardens
- Queen Elizabeth Park, British Columbia
- Urban parks in Canada
