= Sheridan Nurseries =

Garden supplies company in Ontario, Canada

- Type: Garden supplies
- Founded: 1913
- Founder: Howard and Lorrie Dunington-Grubb
- Headquarters: Georgetown, Ontario, Canada
- Area served: Ontario
- Website: www.sheridannurseries.com

Sheridan Nurseries is a Canadian garden supplies company based in the Toronto area. The company has over 375 hectares (930 acres) of land for growing plants and eight garden centers. Employment varies seasonally, but during peak periods it has over 1,000 staff.

== History ==
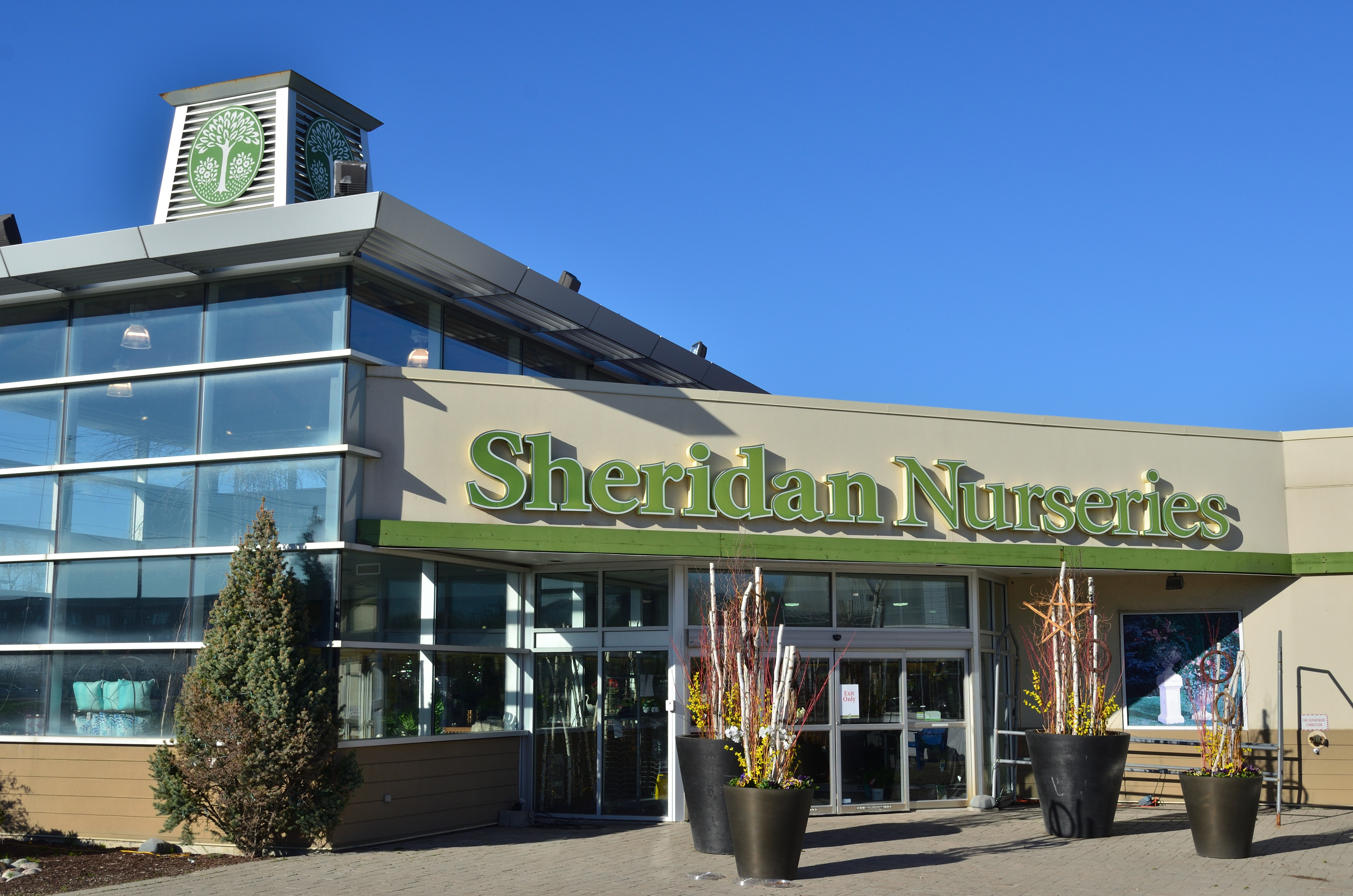
Sheridan Nurseries in Markham

The British landscape architects Howard and Lorrie Dunington-Grubb founded Sheridan Nurseries in 1913 in the hamlet of Sheridan outside Oakville, Ontario. They bought 100 acres (40 ha) of land, of which only about 20 acres (8.1 ha) turned out to be suitable for ornamental plants. The Dunington-Grubbs hired Sven Herman Stensson to run the nursery after he responded to an advertisement in an English paper. By 1926 the nursery had grown to 250 acres (100 ha), with a wide range of trees, shrubs and perennials. The first seasonal garden centers were opened in the early 1920s near the Yonge and Bloor intersection in what is now downtown Toronto and on Southdown Road in Mississauga.

Sheridan Nurseries has been involved in finding or developing hybrids suitable for the harsh Canadian climate. They acquired seeds of the hardy Korean boxwood in 1922, and first listed it in their catalog in 1939. It became a great success. The company's 1939 catalog described the Alpine currant as "the most satisfactory shrub for a deciduous hedge" and called the Japanese yew "the best shrub available for an evergreen hedge of moderate height."

In the 1940s, Sheridan Nurseries was one of many Ontario employers who used Japanese labourers interned in camps after being forcibly relocated from British Columbia during the Second World War:

Sheridan Nurseries hired 22 Japanese internees in 1943 and their business records show the men were not slave labour, but paid employees. While the Caucasian workers were paid 48 cents an hour, the Japanese internees received 44 cents.

Starting in the late 1960s the Sheridan Nurseries began developing hardy alternatives to the English box for hedging.

They are crosses of buxus sempervirens and the very hardy buxus microphylla. Sheridan Nurseries also developed Mountbatten Juniper and Ivory Silk Japanese Tree Lilac.

=== 21st century ===
As of 2010 three of Herman Stensson's grandchildren were senior managers in the company. The company had more than 375 hectares (930 acres) of land, including 60 hectares (150 acres) of container growing. The company had about 280 full-time employees, rising to around 1,000 in early April. It was suffering from difficulty finding workers for the farms, where conditions in the Ontario summer can be extremely hot and humid. About 100 workers from Mexico and Jamaica were being employed on the farms each year.

By 2012 the company was the largest garden center retailer and grower in Canada. That year Sheridan Nurseries won the International Grower of the Year award from the International Association of Horticultural Producers. The company celebrated its 100th anniversary in 2013. In May 2013 the company said it would donate 1,000 plants to communities in the Greater Toronto Area that had a severe need for green space or plants, and was asking the public to suggest areas to be considered. As of 2014 the company had nine garden centers in Mississauga, Georgetown. Toronto, Unionville, North York, Whitby, Scarborough and Kitchener-Waterloo.

== Sources ==
- "A Brief History of Sheridan Nurseries". Sheridan Nurseries.
- Butts, Edward; Stensson, Karl (2012-10-27). Sheridan Nurseries: One Hundred Years of People, Plans, and Plants. Dundurn. ISBN 978-1-4597-0564-7.
- Byrtus, Nancy; Fram, Mark; McClelland, Michael (2013-09-27). East/West: A Guide to Where People Live in Downtown Toronto. Coach House Books. ISBN 978-1-77056-043-7.
- Day, Sonia (23 February 2013). "Sheridan Nurseries' plant expert gets credit for inspiring columnist's love of gardening". The Toronto Star. Archived from the original on 2013-03-06.
- Eck, Joe; Winterrowd, Wayne (2010-02-22). Our Life in Gardens. Farrar, Straus and Giroux. ISBN 978-1-4299-4450-2.
- Fox, Kat (10 February 2013). "Sheridan Nurseries celebrates 100". Garden Making.
- "Garden Centres". Sheridan Nurseries.
- "Live Green with Sheridan Nurseries". Landscape Ontario. 13 May 2013.
- "Sheridan Nurseries - In the business of growing". The Canadian Business Journal. February 2010.
- "Sheridan Nurseries". Canadian Wildlife Federation.
- "Sheridan Nurseries Receives International Award". The Landscape New Brunswick Horticultural Trades Association.
