= Eugene Martini =

American architect (1915–1965)

Eugene Richard Martini (1915 – January 23, 1965) was an American landscape architect and landscape planner.

== Early life and education ==
Martini received a Bachelor of Fine Arts degree in landscape architecture from the University of Illinois in 1939.

== Career ==
Martini spent the early part of his career as a land-planning consultant working with the Federal Housing Administration (FHA) in Chicago, Illinois; and Atlanta, Georgia, from 1941 to 1946, before forming Eugene R. Martini and Associates, Landscape Architects and Planning Consultants, in Atlanta.

His work focused on community planning, parks, subdivisions, mobile-home courts, and federal initiatives that addressed the military-family-housing shortage following World War II. He was a design consultant for the southeastern region of the Public Housing Administration, an active member of American Society of Landscape Architects and a consultant to the book Landscape Planning, published by Better Homes and Gardens magazine in 1963.

Martini helped establish a community of landscape architects in Atlanta throughout the 1950s and early 1960s and mentored Edward Daugherty, FASLA, who worked in the office during his summers while studying at the Harvard Graduate School of Design (1948–1951). Daugherty noted that other landscape architects in Atlanta working on similar projects at the time included H. Boyer Marx and Willard Byrd.

From 1963 to 1965, Martini was second vice president of the American Society of Landscape Architects and participated in various other memberships throughout his career, including the American Institute of City Planners, the American Society of Planning Officials, the Urban Land Institute, the Georgia Engineering Society, the American Planning and Civic Association, and the Atlanta Chamber of Commerce.

== Projects ==
This list is a very incomplete list of Martini's projects, but available documentation suggests the following:

- Master plan for Aiken Estates, South Carolina (1953)
- Original design of Bagley Park (now Frankie Allen) in Atlanta, Georgia (1954)
- Park Road Shopping Center (1956), one of Charlotte, North Carolina's oldest shopping centers, located at the intersection of Park and Woodlawn roads. (Drawings, 1953, 1956, UNCC Manuscript Collection, 210)
- Cocoa Isles Masterplan, Florida (1957), published in Geoffrey and Susan Jellicoe's magnum opus, The Landscape of Man described as "man-made ecosystems....that must absorb the peculiarities and idiosyncrasies of man".
- Contribution to Tuxedo Park in the Buckhead neighborhood of Atlanta, Georgia, Georgia
- Tower Mobile Homes Court, Leesville, Louisiana (1960), with Edwards and Portman, AIA (published in an article by Eugene Martini, "Mobile Homes, Immobile Landscape, or: Who Said You Can't Take It with You?" Landscape Architecture, v.50, Fall 1960)

== Published work ==
=== Landscape Planning ===
Landscape Planning, 1963, (Des Moines, Iowa: Meredith Books). A book edited and published by Better Homes and Gardens magazine includes work by Thomas Dolliver Church. Organized around seven chapters and a home portfolio, the book highlights recent trends in landscape design to make the best use of the yard with low-maintenance examples to create livable gardens that increase convenience, privacy, beauty and pleasure. Convenience is meant to make things easier, "a gate wide enough for both the wheelbarrow and your knuckles!" asserted Martini. Privacy is the choice to control what we do in our daily lives, for example, getting the morning paper in your bathrobe. Beauty is the principal reward and goal when planning the composition of your garden. Last, pleasure is "the feeling that all things are 'right with the world'". (10–12).

=== "Mobile Homes, Immobile Landscape" ===
"Mobile Homes, Immobile Landscape, or: Who Said You Can't Take It with You?" Landscape Architecture, v.50, Fall 1960. In this article, Martini recognized the growing industry of mobile homes and the challenge to the landscape architect to place them within a community. In the end, he questioned 'What can the landscape architect do?' to help the impoverished landscape of mobile-home courts and asserted:

His work involves designing mobile-home communities by optimizing unit placement to meet density requirements while minimizing site grading and preserving existing vegetation. In addition to site planning, he assists clients with site selection and analysis, coordinates with local planning authorities, and collaborates with civil, electrical, and building engineers on community development.

=== "Twenty Thousand Dollars per Acre Is Cheap" ===
"Twenty Thousand Dollars per Acre Is Cheap" Landscape Architecture, v.49, no.4, Summer 1959, pp. 226–229. This article describes the challenges of planning a subdivision in the Buckhead area along Peachtree Road in Atlanta, Georgia.

=== Other writings ===
Martini also wrote numerous articles for the Journal of the American Institute of Architects, American Builder, and American City.
