= The London Distillery Company =

Distillery in London

The London Distillery Company Ltd.
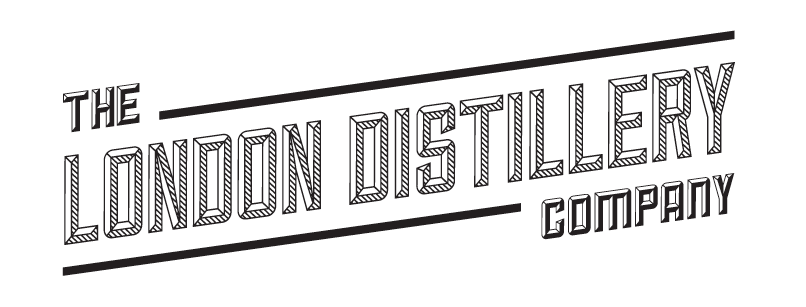
- Type: Private
- Industry: Distillation
- Founded: Originally Founded: 2011; Revived: Jan,2025; 6 months ago in London, United Kingdom
- Founders: Darren Rook; Nick Taylor
- Headquarters: Unit 8, Bankhead Industrial Estate, Bankhead Drive, Edinburgh, EH11 4BP, United Kingdom
- Key people: Matt McKay; Derek Mair
- Products: Single malt English whisky
- Owner: Gleann Mor Spirits
- Website: https://londondistillery.co.uk/

The London Distillery Company, also known as TLDC, is a phoenix company and was the first whisky distillery in London since Lea Valley distillery closed in 1903.

Originally located in Battersea, London. The company has change ownership twice since 2020 and now operates in Bermondsey.

The company was originally founded in 2011 by drinks industry entrepreneur Darren Rook, and angel investment expert, Nick Taylor.

In January 2020, the company went into administration under the management of Killian O'Sullivan following Rook's departure in 2018. The British Honey Company purchased the Dodd's Gin and whisky brands.

In January 2025, TLDC was relaunched by new owner Gleann Mor Spirits. The company focus is on both blended and single malt whisky

== History ==
=== Georgian era ===
In 1807 Ralph Dodd proposed to build a distillery in Nine Elms, London. The company, to be called The London Distillery Company, took receipt of monies and share subscriptions for transferable shares. Dodd created a board of directors from prominent peers and engineers, partly prompted by Dodd's involvement with an 1806 business proposal for the Vauxhall Bridge Company.

The board of directors comprised: James Heygate, Ralph Dodd, John Taylor, William Clay, William Norris, Fenwick Bulmer, Samuel Sharpe, John Moore, Matthew Wilson, James Norris, John Calvert Clarke, Thomas Rolle, Abraham Walker, John Moore and Christopher Dunkin.

Following a complaint by a prominent Essex-based corn distillery headed by Tory MP Philip Metcalfe the English Crown brought a case against Dodd and The London Distillery Company under the 1720 Bubble Act. This was after raising funds, assembling staff and acquiring the Old Water Mill at Nine Elms on the Thames for £12,000. As the first case to be made under this act the Crown hired barrister Sir William Garrow as prosecutor. Dodd lost the case and the business was disbanded.

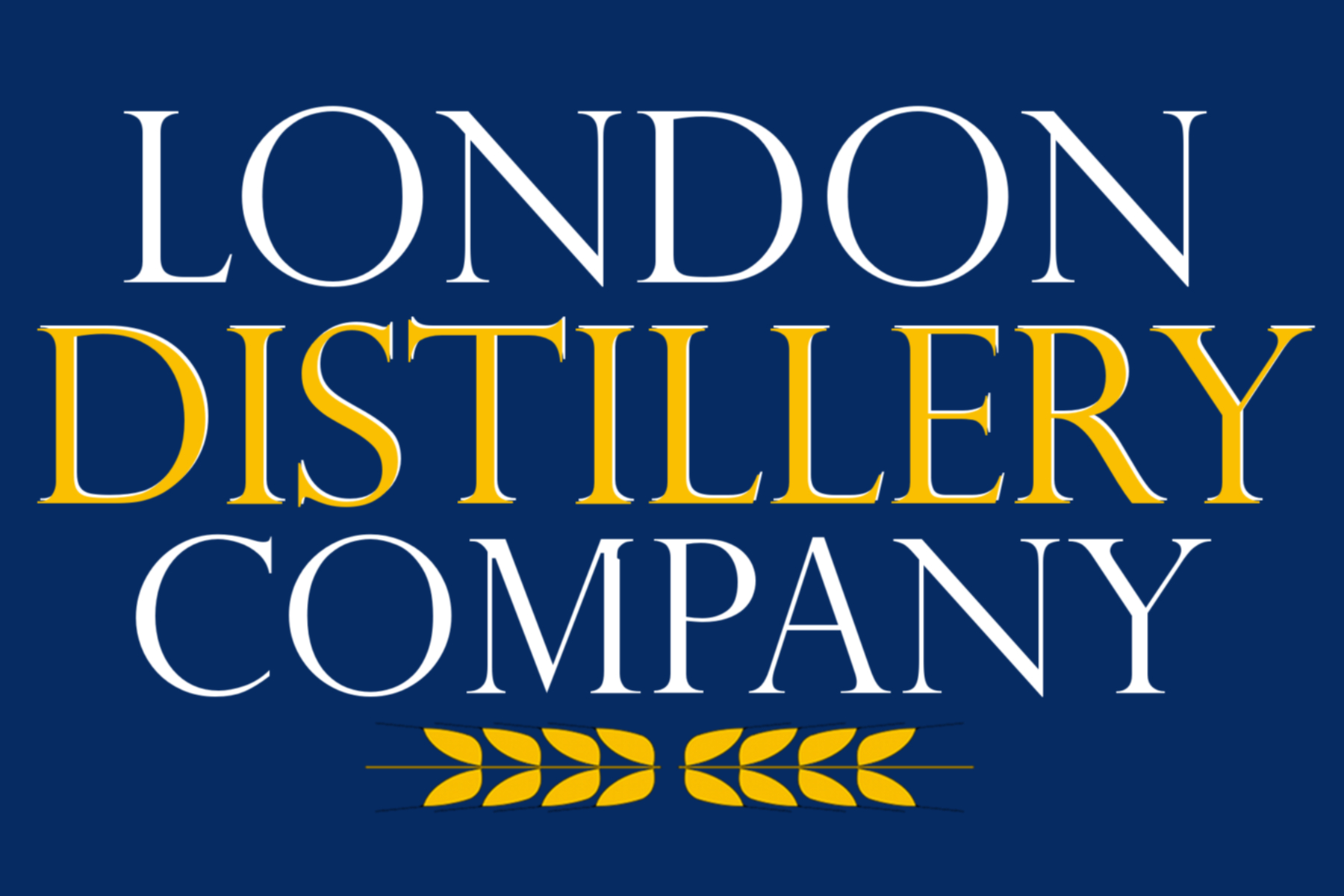
The London Distillery Company logo from 2011 - used during the company's early funding stages

=== 21st century business ===
==== Start-up funding ====
The London Distillery Company Ltd filed dormant trading accounts from June 2011 to March 2012.

Starting in early November 2011 TLDC took part in investment network Envestors Ltd's Rising Stars initiative to raise £250,000 against 45% equity. By late January 2012, TLDC had raised £150,000 through friends and family of both founders and the Envestors network. As traditional investment slowed down Rook decided to seek funding on crowd funding website CrowdCube to help raise a further £100,000.

In 2011 The London Distillery Company was established by drinks industry entrepreneur Darren Rook, and angel investment expert, Nick Taylor. TLDC was London's first whisky distillery since the Lea Valley distillery closed in 1903.

==== Move from Battersea ====
In October 2015, TLDC's original location on Parkgate Road in Battersea was sold to a property developer and the business was relocated. Rook secured the company a railway arch on London's 'Beer Mile' on Druid Street, Bermondsey. Following the move production at the distillery was shut down for eight months while the company transferred its distilling approvals from HMRC.

During this time period Rook secured TLDC a long-term lease at Battersea Power Station with plans to open a dedicated gin distillery that would house Europe's largest gin bar, a hidden whisky members club and event space. In early 2017, Rook began to promote the expansion of the business to Battersea with its whisky production remaining in Bermondsey as well as the potential for a chain of gin bars across the UK. However, Rook citing difference with key board members resigned from his role as a director and company CEO in October 2017. In November 2017, Killian O'Sullivan was appointed as Rook's replacement as Managing Director on the company board.

The Battersea project was cancelled by O'Sullivan in February 2018 and in 2019, they launched a second (but unsuccessful) Crowdcube crowdfunding campaign to raise £500,000.

==== Administration ====
After the loss of TLDC's Chinese business assets that had been co-founded by Rook in 2013 and a further failed funding round by O’Sullivan, in December 2019, three TLDC directors resigned, and in January 2020 the company appointed Geoffrey Martin & Co as administrators.

On 17 January 2020, the British Honey Company (BHC) announced to TLDC shareholders that, following discussions with administrators to purchase some TLDC assets, it had taken over the distillery operations. The BHC founders then incorporated a new business on 20 January 2020 as The London Distillery Company (BHC) Ltd.

=== 2025 ===
In January 2025, the company was relaunched by new owners Gleann Mor Spirits with Matt McKay, previously of Bimber and Dunphail Distilleries as the company's new managing director and whisky maker.

== Production ==
=== Fermentation ===
For single malt whisky and rye, TLDC uses two 2,200 litre stainless steel fermenters from Christian CARL.

TLDC uses organic grains and traditional London yeast varieties such as Whitbread B and Young's which are propagated as a liquid yeast slurry by Surebrew. Both were used for early-stage fermentation trails by Rook in December 2013.

Rum production began in early 2017 and used 600ltr ex-wine barrels converted to fermentation vessels by company founder Darren Rook. TLDC uses fresh organic sugar cane juice blended with dissolved organic rapadura sugar from Costa Rica and a combination of wild yeast and ale yeast. During initial trials, Rook created a dunder pit using British fruits and pot ale.

=== Distillation ===
The London Distillery Company Ltd currently operates two pot stills.

For whisky production, they distil on a 650 litres copper pot still with a 4 plate distillation column which was manufactured in Stuttgart, Germany. Manufactured by Christian CARL GmbH, Germany's oldest distillery fabricator since 1869, the still head was designed by Darren Rook.

TLDC uses a Buchi R2 rotary evaporator for part of its gin production process.

== Whisky ==
=== The 109s ===
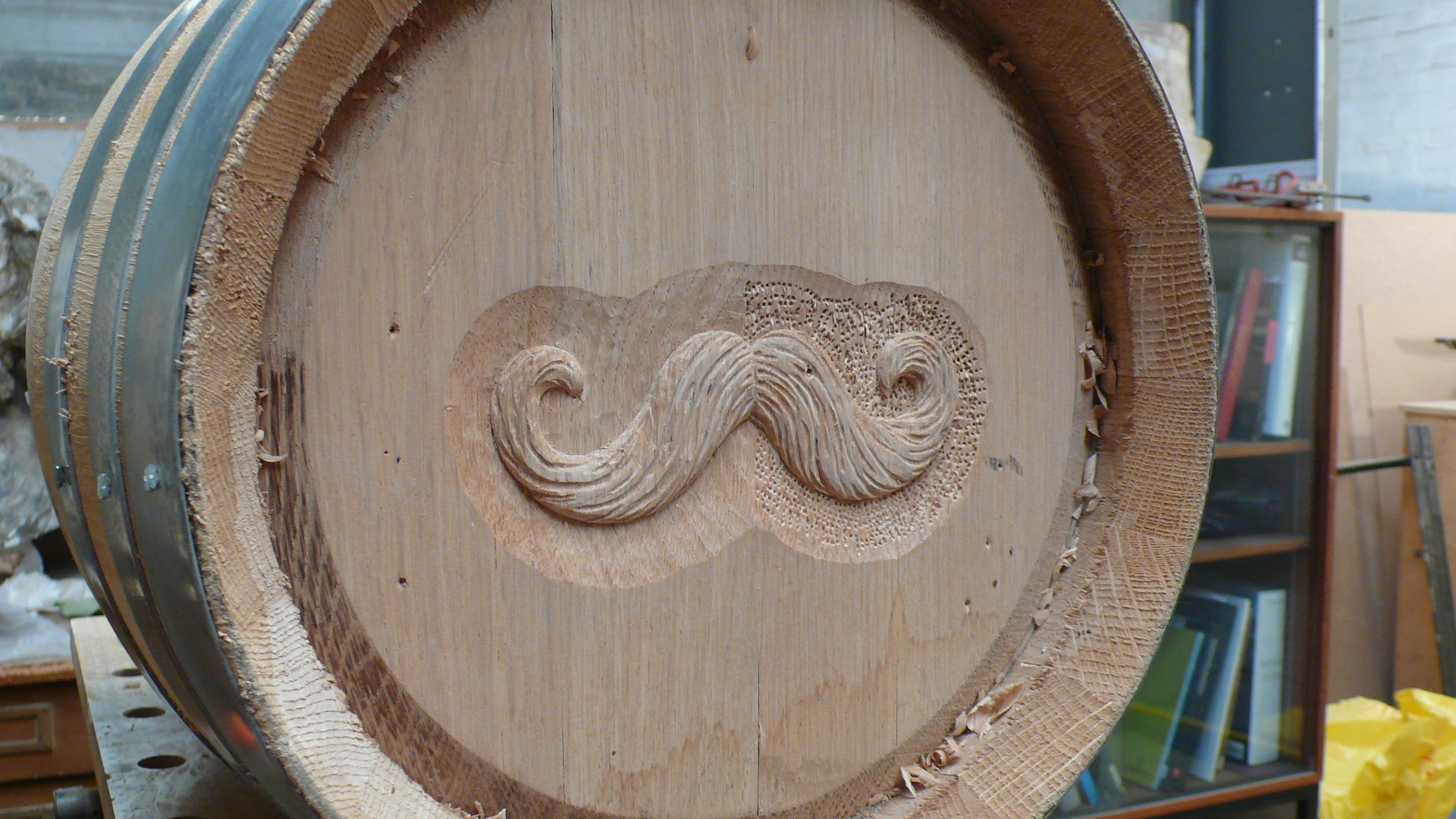
The first 109 cask

The 109 casks were launched in November 2012 as a part of The London Distillery Company's involvement with the men's health charity Movember.

=== Rye Whisky ===
TLDC launched its first Rye whisky aged in English oak casks in 2018.

It was made using organic malted British Rye from Warminster Maltings and a brewers yeast from the early 1900s stored at the national yeast library.

=== Single Malt ===
Launched in February 2019 TLDC first single malt whisky was produced by the company founder Darren Rook using 100% Plummage Archer, a rare variety of organic barley grown on the Duchy Estates by the HRH Prince of Wales. The Plummage Archer malt was created in 1914, and accounted for 80% of all brewing and distilling in the 1960s; it's believed to be a parent of the Maris Otter.

The wort was then fermented with two types of yeast. TLDC's own 1920s Distiller and early varietal of Whitbread B from yeast specialist Surebrew in Surrey.

== Gin ==
=== TESTBED1 ===
In collaboration with Dr Jason Grizzanti the Company pioneered a new gin category: Anglo-American Gin, acting as a crossover between the juniper-forward London Dry Gins and the more experimental New Western styles of American gins.

The first release from the TESTBED range gives people the opportunity to chart the various stages of gin development. The gin gets its distinct complexity from varying proportions of unique, organic botanicals – including bilberry, lovage root and lavender. South London freelance artist Jasmin Ford illustrated the package artwork.

=== Dodd's Gin ===
Dodd's gin was launched in April 2013 with luxury retailer Fortnum & Mason. Created by Rook, and trainee distiller Andrew Macleod Smith, it was released as a tribute to Ralph Dodd. It is bottled at 49.9% ABV.

The recipe includes juniper, angelica, lime peel, bay laurel, green and black cardamom, red raspberry leaf and London honey. The label design was done by Manchester-based agency, United Creative and was inspired by the geometry used in the early 1800s. In 2017 TLDC released an Old Tom version of Dodd's Gin as a permanent addition to the range.

The brand has also released several limited edition versions of Dodd's Gins exclusively with Fortnum & Mason. This includes a barrel-aged and honey variant.

=== Fortnum & Mason London Dry Gin ===
In 2015, TLDC rebranded, redeveloped and relaunched Fortnum & Mason's London dry gin in partnership with the iconic London based retailer.

Fortnum's gin was initially made by Thames Distillers using a classic London Dry Gin recipe and was presented in a 700ml drinks industry standard bottle with a simple black and silver label. Rook and the team at United Creatives changed the bottle to a 500ml format and updated the label to include the Fortnum & Mason's brand colours whilst drawing inspiration from the store's architecture and original clock logo.

The gin recipe was developed using the Fortnum & Mason's archives to research ingredients from the store's tea and spice trading heritage. TLDC uses organic botanicals such as bergamot peel, nutmeg and juniper in the recipe.

=== Kew Organic Gin ===
Kew Organic Gin launched in 2016 under an exclusive license with the Royal Botanic Gardens, Kew. It uses plants foraged from the gardens including Santolina, Lavender and Eucalyptus.

In 2017, brand extensions were added to include an orange liqueur, Orangery, and a navy style gin, Explorers Strength. Developed by Rook they are intended to tell the Royal Botanic garden history of securing and conserving plants from around the world.

Until 2020 The London Distillery Company was one of 24 distilleries in London also producing gin.

== See also ==
- List of companies based in London
