= Glass Age Development Committee =

The Glass Age Development Committee was established in 1937 by Pilkington to promote the use of glass as a building material in the United Kingdom. It commissioned designs for many large-scale schemes, none of which were ever built.

Initially its name was the Glass Age Town Planning Committee. The first committee consisted of the first-generation modern architects Maxwell Fry, Robert Furneaux Jordan, Raymond McGrath, Howard Robertson, George Grey Wornum and F. R. S. Yorke. Each was asked to "suggest solutions to certain problems of town planning in London, Edinburgh, Liverpool and Bournemouth", using "all the structural and decorative resources of the Glass Age, but [to] produce practical schemes that could actually be built. An imaginative use of modern materials, rather than mere romantic fantasy was desired". This being a marketing tool led by Pilkington, most of the problems were as unrealistic as the solutions. The designs followed early CIAM ideals in sweeping away historical areas such as the Strand and Bond Street in London, and Princes Street in Edinburgh, in favour of extrusions of stacked floorplates walled in glass similar to the Miesian skyscrapers of c. 1920.

During the 1950s the Committee was formed of Geoffrey Jellicoe, Edward D. Mills and Ove Arup & Partners, and it was joined by other architects for individual projects. The design briefs were for Britain in the year 2000, but realistic in that they were to make use of technology that was already available. Notable schemes included a proposal in 1955 to demolish the entire area of Soho and rebuild it entirely in glass, a 1957 proposal for the replacement of St Giles Circus in London with a 150-foot (46 m) tall glass heliport, and the 1963 "Crystal Span" proposal for the replacement of London's Vauxhall Bridge with a seven-storey glass building straddling the River Thames, which was to have contained a shopping mall, luxury hotel, residential development and a museum to house the modern art collection now housed at Tate Modern.

The Glass Age Development Committee is best known for its ambitious 1968 proposal for a glass and concrete offshore city housing 21,000 people, to be anchored off the coast near Great Yarmouth and accessed from the mainland by hovercraft. The development was to have been called Sea City. The structure would have been 4,700 feet (1,400 m) long and 3,300 feet (1,000 m) wide, and would have rested on concrete islands supported by piers. It was intended that the development would have been economically self-sufficient thanks to boatbuilding workshops, fish farming, and the export of fresh water from an onboard desalination plant, while a lagoon in the centre of the development would support a tourist industry based on skin diving and water skiing.
