= Ralph Dodd =

British civil engineer

- Born: 1756; South or North Shields
- Died: 11 April 1822; Cheltenham
- Education: Royal Academy for five years
- Spouse: Fanny Lambert
- Children: George Dodd; Barrodall Dodd; One more son & one daughter
- Parent: Alexander Dodd
- Engineering career
- Projects: Gravesend to Tilbury Tunnel; Grand Surrey Canal; Vauxhall Bridge; South London Waterworks Company; East London Waterworks Company; West Middlesex Waterworks Company; The Intended London Distillery Company
- Awards: Knighted in 1817

Ralph Dodd (c. 1756 – 11 April 1822) was a late 18th-century British civil engineer primarily known for his attempt to produce the first tunnel underneath the Thames in 1798.

== Life and family ==
Born in the North East of England, Ralph Dodd was the second son of Alexander Dodd, and had an aptitude for drawing along with his elder brother Robert Dodd (1748–1816). After receiving an education in mechanics, both Ralph and his brother Robert spent five and a half years at the Royal Academy schools practicing as a portrait painter. His older brother Robert is known for his maritime landscapes and works on the French Revolutionary Wars.

Dodd had two sons, Barrodall Robert Dodd (c.1780-1837) and George Dodd (c.1783-1827); who both became engineers and pioneers of steam power. His namesake, Ralph Dodd(s) (1792-1874) went on to become an engineer and mentor to locomotive engineers George Stephenson (1781-1848) and relative Isaac Dodds (1801-1882), founder of Isaac Dodds and Son.

He has been well documented as an innovator and registered a number of building patents, including British Patent No 3141 on 3 June 1801 for a building system that was over 150 years ahead of its time.

As a high-profile founder and promoter of engineering schemes, particularly in London, England, Dodd generally resigned his tender as engineer within one to two years of his projects receiving parliamentary approval. Most of his schemes went on to be successfully completed by renowned engineers of the day, such as John Rennie and Robert Mylne. During his career, Ralph Dodd, was known for his flair for publicity and generating public interest, but has been portrayed by some of his detractors as a failure due to his general early departure from these companies despite repeated success.

In December 1821 he suffered severe burns when the boiler of the paddle steamer Sovereign (80 feet long, of the River Severn Steam Yacht Co, built by H. Turner, Stourport and registered on 30 Jan. 1822, British National Archives Registration No BT/107/168) exploded at Gloucester on her trial run. The damage sustained to the ship was so bad that she was broken up directly. Following the accident he took advice to go to Cheltenham for his health and, since he was nearly penniless, he walked there in the middle of winter. He died at Cheltenham on 11 April 1822.

== Tunnels ==
Having been employed to undertake surveys of canals, coal mines, harbours and other civil engineering works of the late eighteenth century Dodd turned his attention to tunnels, proposing the first under water tunnel in the United Kingdom in 1796. The Tynemouth proposal was for a tunnel between North Shields and South Shields, which was inspired by local undersea mining activities in Wylam and Whitehaven and was based on estimating parameters used for tunnel costings for the Grand Junction Canal.

=== Gravesend to Tilbury ===
Gravesend and Tilbury Tunnel Act 1799
- Act of Parliament
- Parliament of Great Britain
- Long title: An act for making and maintaining a tunnel, or road, under the river Thames, from or near to the town of Gravesend, in the county of Kent, to or near to Tilbury Fort, in the county of Essex.
- Citation: 39 Geo. 3. c. lxxiii
- Territorial extent: Great Britain

Dates
- Royal assent: 12 July 1799
- Commencement: 12 July 1799 (Note: The Acts of Parliament (Commencement) Act 1793.)
Other legislation
| Amended by | Post Office Act 1969; Post Office Act 1969 (Appointed Day) Order 1969 |

Status: Amended

Text of statute as originally enacted

In 1798 Dodd published his proposal for the building of a tunnel between Gravesend and Tilbury to "the great and the good" of Kent and Essex. His prospectus for the business played on the military advantages in having a tunnel as it had long been recognised that there was a need to be able to move troops rapidly between Kent and Essex in the event of war.

The proposal was of great interest to the military, but Charles Clarke of the Gravesend Ordnance Office was not impressed. In particular he believed that the tunnel design would not work as Dodd had not thought through the dimensions correctly, but also that the design was fundamentally flawed and sought to provide mathematical proof of this. He also challenged assumptions about the likely use of the tunnel and questioned Dodd's experience and capabilities. Despite Clarke's objections, and by eliciting the support of people in high places, a company to build the tunnel was set up and an act of Parliament, the Gravesend and Tilbury Tunnel Act 1799 (39 Geo. 3. c. lxxiii) was passed to approve its construction.

The tunnel was started some 800 yards (730 m) east of Tilbury Fort, to join Tilbury to Gravesend in 1798. Much difficulty was experienced with flooding so a steam driven pump and digging machines were commissioned in 1801. After a number of disasters the pumping was abandoned and a figure of £15,242 was expended before the project was terminated in 1802.

=== Gravesend to Strood ===
In 1798 Dodd also proposed a canal from near Gravesend to Strood. This became the Thames and Medway Canal though it is not clear whether he was involved past the planning and approvals stage. Although this canal was closed, a tunnel forming part of the route, which for many years was shared by the canal and railway is used by trains travelling between Gravesend and Strood.

== Waterworks ==
Despite little experience of water works in 1805 Dodd published his book 'Observations on Water' in which he proposed the creation of numerous London waterworks.

== Canals and waterways ==
In 1795 Dodd wrote An Account of the Principal Canals in the Known World. As a riposte, J. Whitfield wrote The Engineering Plagiarist, accusing Dodd of copying John Philips' General History of Inland Navigation, Newcastle 1792. However, he was undeterred and continued to work on canal schemes.

=== Newcastle-Carlisle-Maryport Canal ===
In January 1794 Dodd surveyed and proposed the Newcastle-Carlisle-Maryport Canal. Subsequently, William Chapman and William Jessop did a more detailed survey. By June 1795 he published a pamphlet proposing a canal from Stella in Blaydon-on-Tyne to Hexham on the south side of the River Tyne and estimated a cost of £35,709 for 18 miles of canal with 12 locks.

John Sutcliffe rejected Ralph Dodd's plans and proposed a different Stella to Hexham line 44 feet wide at the surface and 6 feet deep taking craft between 50 and 60 tons, but not existing keels. This 17 mile, 18 lock route was estimated at almost £90,000 to bring a revenue of £23,460 and a net yield of £17,595.

Having a looked at John Sutcliffe's plans, Robert Whitworth approved it, noting 'is a rugged one; I never before saw a good line like it; yet so far as I can discover, I believe it is the best the country affords: It is certainly practicable, and I have no doubt but that a good and useful canal may be made (with some variation) upon it; but it will be exceedingly expensive: I am, however, told the trade that will come upon this canal will fully answer that expense, even were it twice as much'.

=== Thames and Medway Canal ===
Following a successful proposal to Parliament, the Thames and Medway Canal Act 1800 (39 & 40 Geo. 3. c. xxiii) was obtained by Dodd. Following suggested amendments by John Rennie in 1802 works began with management of the construction and engineering being undertaken by John Rowe.

=== Grand Surrey Canal ===
Dodd suggested and promoted plans for a canal between Croydon and Rotherhithe during 1799. In 1800 this developed into the Grand Surrey Canal and the Croydon Canal and his plans were authorised by an act of Parliament, the Grand Surrey Canal Act 1801 (41 Geo. 3. (U.K.) c. xxxi), obtained on 21 May 1801. This created the Company of Proprietors of the Grand Surrey Canal, and gave them powers to raise £60,000 by issuing shares, and an additional £30,000 if required.

Dodd, assisted by his sons Barrodall and George, began engineering works but resigned from the project to be replaced by Rennie, a position that was to be repeated.

=== Other proposed works ===
- 1800: Involved with the Mersey and Irwell navigation
- 1802: Proposal for North London (London to Cambridge) - not executed
- 1810: Proposed link between Andover and Basingstoke canals - not executed
- 1815: Continuation of Surrey Canal to Vauxhall - not executed

== Bridges ==
=== Vauxhall Bridge ===
Originally presented as The Prospectus for the Intended Prince's Bridge Ralph Dodd's hand written observations can be found at Battersea Library, London. Following numerous months taking tally notes on crossing types at Battersea Bridge, then operating a toll system, Dodd petitioned the Prince Regent in 1806-1811 for an act of Parliament allowing the construction of a bridge across the Thames to relieve congestion.

Dodd was successful in receiving the Vauxhall Bridge Act 1809 (49 Geo. 3. c. cxlii), but exited the project in 1812 after being renamed the Vauxhall Bridge Company. Once again replaced by Rennie who was unsuccessful in this endeavour and also resign from the project.

=== Springfield Bridge ===
The Springfield Bridge was constructed in 1819–1821.

== Docks, harbours and ports ==
Following his work on canals and waterways Ralph Dodd briefly turned his attention to harbours producing two proposals. First in 1800 with Ralph Dodd cooperating on a huge Port of London improvement scheme together with other, more famous, civil engineers. and later the 1819 Brighton Pier scheme.

=== Other proposals ===
- 1796: Tynemouth Harbour proposal
- 1811: Grimsby harbour proposal

== The intended London Distillery Company ==
In 1807 Ralph Dodd opened public subscriptions for transferable shares to raise capital of £100,000, divided into 2,000 shares of £50 each, for the intended London Distillery Company, to manufacture Genuine British Spirits and Compounds.

Suitable premises were purchased and managers and other officers were employed, including both known malt distiller Mr. Carr and chief rectifier (rectified spirit) Mr. John Taylor. However, no attempt was made to obtain incorporation and a solicitor was engaged to draft a deed of trust. This proved to be an error and in 1808 criminal action was taken against Dodd for the promotion of a scheme for a company with transferable shares in violation of the Bubble Act. Dodd decided to dispute this legal action but ultimately lost the case in 1808 resulting in the dispansion of The London Distillery Company.

== Legacy ==
Britain led the world in the development of canals, bridges and tunnels which acted as a stimulus for the Industrial Revolution by facilitating the transport of raw materials and manufactured goods. Ralph Dodd cannot claim to have been the greatest of technical engineers but his ideas and entrepreneurial flair led to the construction of many important British landmarks, including Vauxhall Bridge in London. Ralph Dodd, with his work on the Gravesend to Tilbury tunnel, the Grand Surrey Canal and London waterworks, paved the way for the civil engineers who followed, such as his sons whom carried out much work on their own account, John Rennie, George Stephenson and Isambard Kingdom Brunel. Dodd was farsighted in realising that the individual canals and waterways being built would eventually be joined, and later forge the way for railways inspiring a new generation of civil engineers.

== Dodd's Gin ==
On 2 April 2013 The London Distillery Company (a modern successor to the 1806 company) launched a super premium gin with luxury retailer Fortnum and Mason in tribute to Ralph Dodd. Dodd's Gin is made using an innovative production technique involving both traditional pot and vacuum distilling. Dodd's Gin is produced, bottled and labelled by hand in Bermondsey, London.

== Writings ==
- An Account of the Principal Canals in the Known World, 1795.
- Various Possible Improvements, Civil & Military, to Hartlepool Harbour, 1795.
- "Reports, with Plans, Section & Proposed Dry Tunnel, or Passage, from Gravesend, in Kent, to Tilbury, in Essex", 1798.
- "Report on the proposed canal navigation between Newcastle and Hexham" 1810.
- “Practical Observations on the Dry Rot in Timber”, 1815.
- The Engineer's Report. Mr. Dodd on the Brighton Sea Jetty, Or Water Promenade, to Project Into the Sea Beyond Low-water Mark, 1819.
