= Susan Jellicoe =

English plantswoman, photographer, writer and editor (1907–1986)

Susan Jellicoe, Lady Jellicoe
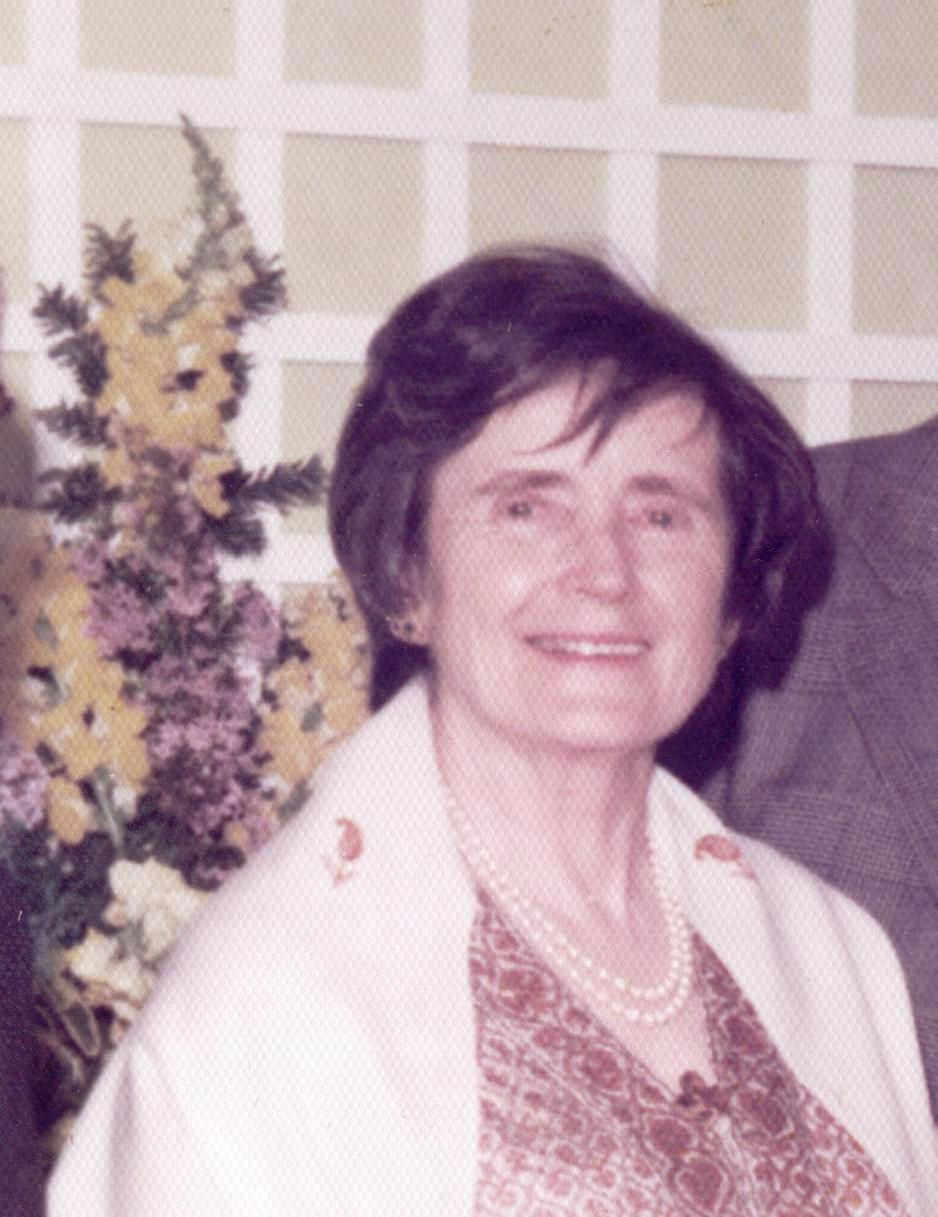
- Lady Jellicoe
- Born: Ursula Pares; 30 June 1907; Liverpool, England
- Died: 1 August 1986 (aged 79)
- Education: St Paul's Girls' School
- Alma mater: Sorbonne University
- Occupations: Plantswoman; photographer; writer; editor
- Organizations: Landscape Institute; International Federation of Landscape Architects (founder)
- Notable work: Modern Private Gardens (1968); Water: The Use of Water in Landscape Architecture (1971); The Landscape of Man (1975); The Oxford Companion to Gardens (1986)
- Spouse: Sir Geoffrey Jellicoe (m. 1936–1986)
- Father: Sir Bernard Pares
- Awards: Honorary degree, University of Sheffield (1985)

Susan Jellicoe, Lady Jellicoe (née Pares; 30 June 1907 – 1 August 1986) was an English plantswoman, photographer, writer, and editor who worked in collaboration with her husband, the landscape architect Sir Geoffrey Jellicoe. Her main interest was in landscape and garden design.

== Early life and education ==
Susan Jellicoe (christened Ursula but known as Susan or Sue) was born in Liverpool on 30 June 1907, the third child of Margaret "Daisy" Ellis (née Dixon; 1879–1964) and Sir Bernard Pares, KBE (1867–1949), a historian and academic known for his work on Russia.

She was educated at St Paul's Girls School, Hammersmith, and the Sorbonne, Paris. On 11 July 1936, she married the landscape architect Geoffrey Jellicoe.

== Career ==
During the war she served in the Ministry of Information department that countered enemy propaganda, working on the analysis of aerial reconnaissance photography.

From 1945, she worked with her husband, designing planting schemes and taking the photographs for his architectural practice. She was an honorary associate of the Landscape Institute and helped found the International Federation of Landscape Architecture (IFLA).

In 1985, she was awarded an honorary degree by the University of Sheffield faculty of Landscape Architecture.

== Death ==
She died on 1 August 1986.

== Writing and editorship ==
Geoffrey and Susan Jellicoe wrote three books together: Modern Private Gardens (1968), Water: The Use of Water in Landscape Architecture (1971) and The Landscape of Man (1975).

With Lady Margery Allen, she co-wrote The Things We See: Gardens (1953), The New Small Garden (1956) and Town Gardens To Live In (1977). She was also co-author of The Oxford Companion to Gardens with Geoffrey Jellicoe, Patrick Goode and Michael Lancaster (1986).

With Dame Sylvia Crowe and Sheila Haywood, she contributed research and photographs to The Gardens of Mughal India: A History and a Guide (1972). From 1961 to 1965, Jellicoe edited The Observer's Gardening Panel. She was editor of the Landscape Institute magazine Landscape Design for 20 years.

== Planting design ==
- 1956 Planting for Harvey's Store Roofgarden, Guildford, Surrey
- 1957–59 Planting for Water Gardens, Hemel Hempstead, Hertfordshire
- 1959 Planting for Cliveden, Taplow, Buckinghamshire
- 1980–86 Planting for Sutton Place Garden, Surrey

== Photography ==
The Susan Jellicoe Photographic Collection is held by the Museum of Rural English Life at the University of Reading alongside the Geoffrey Jellicoe Collection.
