= Geoffrey Jellicoe =

British landscape architect (1900–1996)

Sir Geoffrey Jellicoe CBE RA VMH
- Born: 8 October 1900; Chelsea, London, England
- Died: 17 July 1996 (aged 95); Lyme Regis, England
- Education: Architectural Association
- Occupation: Architect
- Spouse: Susan Pares (m. 1936)
- Projects: JFK Memorial Garden, Runnymede, Hemel Hempstead Water Gardens, Shute House, Sutton Place, Moody Gardens Galveston

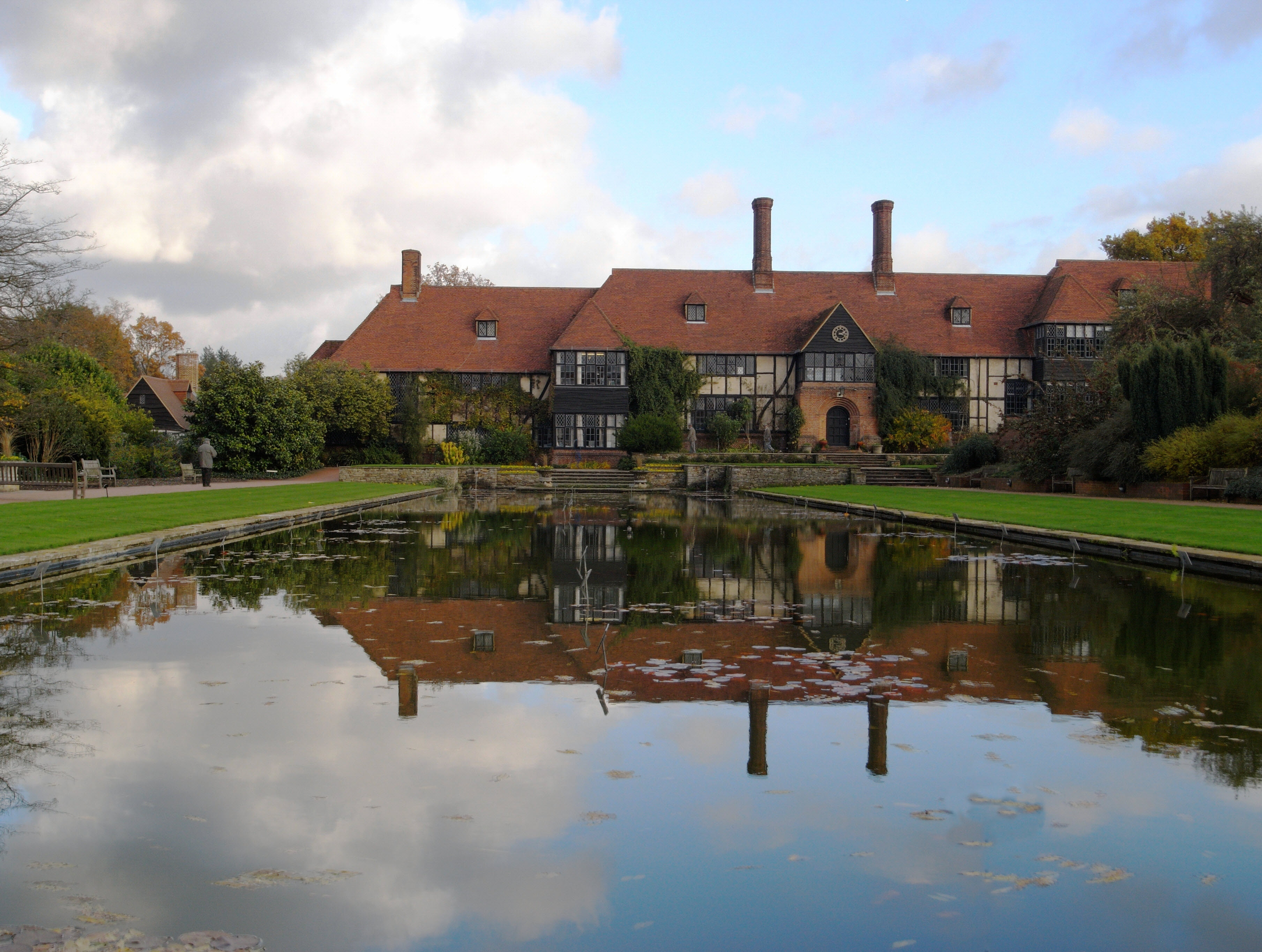
The "Jellicoe Canal" at the RHS Garden Wisley, 1970s

Sir Geoffrey Alan Jellicoe CBE RA VMH (8 October 1900 – 17 July 1996) was an English architect, town planner, landscape architect, garden designer, landscape and garden historian, lecturer and author. His strongest interest was in landscape and garden design.

As a designer, he often included "his distinctive signature characteristics, such as canals, weirs, bridges, viewing platforms and associated planting by Jellicoe's wife, Susan," as at the Hemel Hempstead water gardens he designed for this new town in the late 1950s. The garden canal he designed in the 1970s for the Royal Horticultural Society's gardens at RHS Wisley to display waterlilies was later renamed the "Jellicoe Canal" as a memorial.

== Early life and education ==
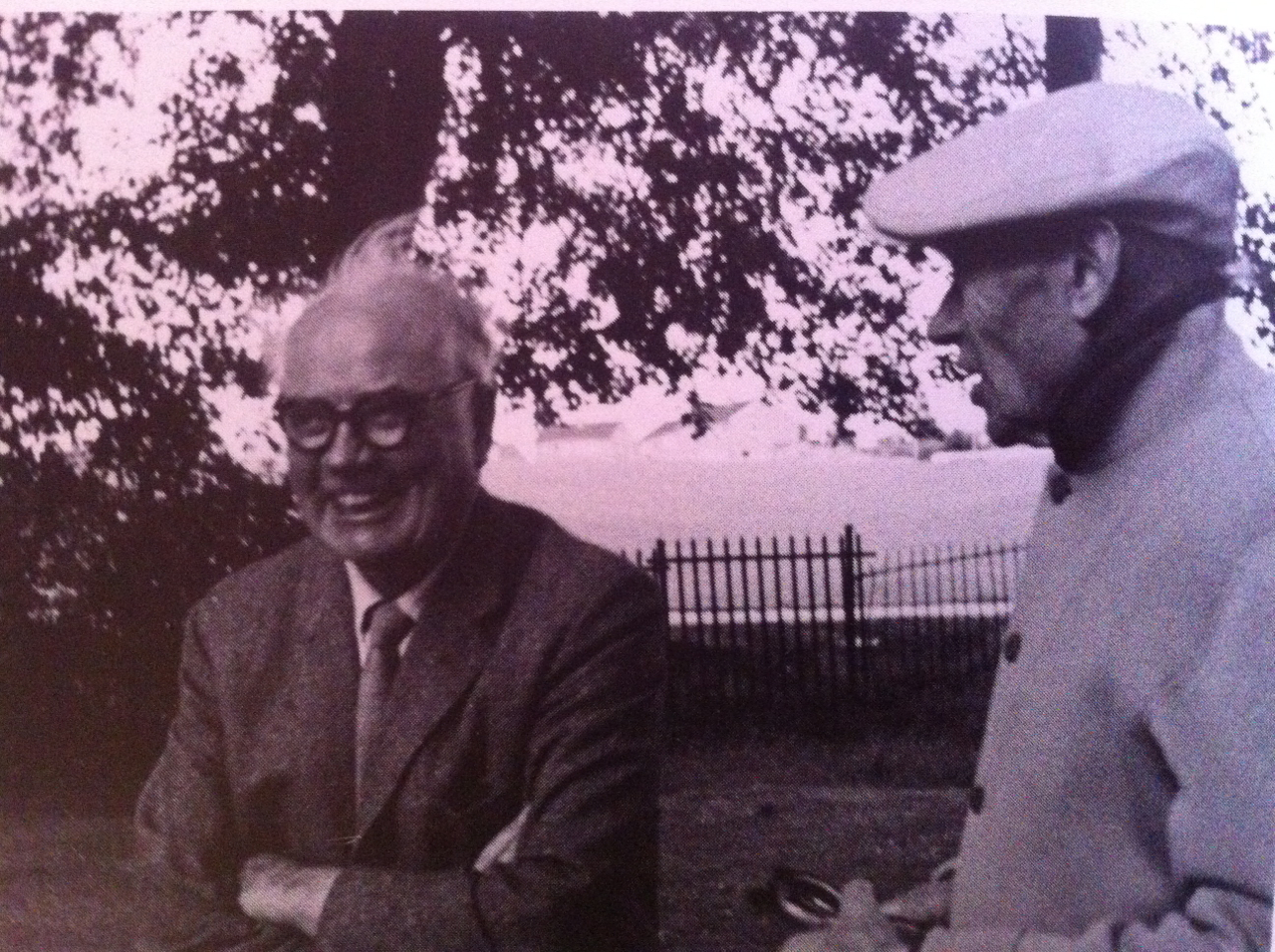
Sir Geoffrey Jellicoe (left) with artist Ben Nicholson

Jellicoe was born in Chelsea, London on 8 October 1900. The younger son of Florence Waterson (née Waylett) and her husband George Edward Jellicoe, a publisher's manager, and later publisher. He trained as an architect at the Architectural Association in London in 1919 and won a British Prix de Rome for Architecture in 1923, which enabled him to research his first book Italian Gardens of the Renaissance with John C. Shepherd. This pioneering study did much to re-awaken interest in this great period of landscape design, and through its copious photographic illustrations publicized the then perilously decayed condition of many of the gardens. He later became principal of the Architectural Association from 1938 to 1942.

== Career ==
In 1929 he was a founding member of the Landscape Institute and from 1939 to 1949 he was its president. In 1948, he became the founding President of the International Federation of Landscape Architects (IFLA). From 1954 to 1968 he was a member of Royal Fine Art Commission, and from 1967 to 1974 a Trustee of Tate Gallery.

Jellicoe taught at the University of Greenwich from 1979 to 1989. He came as a lecturer and visiting critic, usually on six occasions a year.

== Personal life ==
On 11 July 1936, he married Susan Pares (1907–1986), the daughter of Margaret Ellis (Daisy), née Dixon (1879–1964) and Sir Bernard Pares (1867–1949), the historian and academic known for his work on Russia.

== Death and legacy ==
He died in Devon, of heart failure, on the 17 July 1996. He was cremated at Golders Green Crematorium.

National Life Stories conducted an oral history interview (C467/6) with Geoffrey Jellicoe in 1996 for its Architects Lives' collection, held by the British Library.

== Recognition ==
Jellicoe was appointed a Commander of the Order of the British Empire (CBE) in the 1961 New Year Honours, and knighted in the 1979 Birthday Honours for services to landscape architecture.

He was elected as a Royal Academician (RA) on 29 May 1991, and awarded the Victoria Medal of Honour (VMH), the Royal Horticultural Society's highest award, in 1994.

== Design projects ==
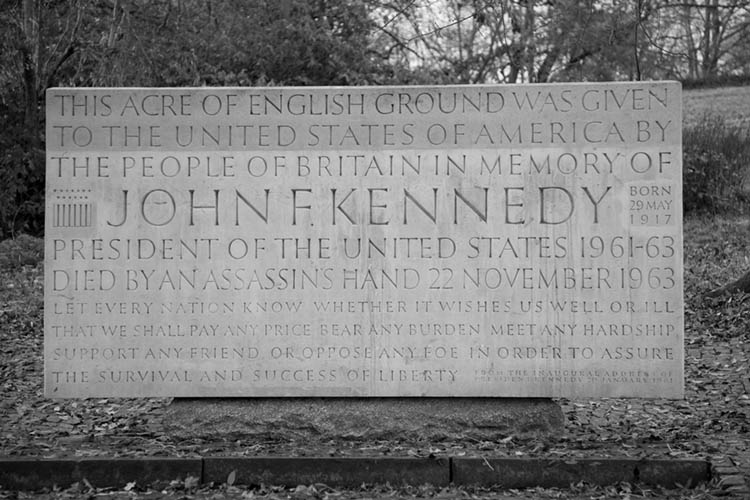
JFK Memorial stone at Runnymede, Surrey. Garden designed by Jellicoe and dedicated in 1965.

Note: All locations below are in England unless stated otherwise.

- 1934–36 Caveman Restaurant, Cheddar Gorge, Somerset
- 1934–39 Ditchley Park, Oxfordshire
- 1935 Plan for Calverton Colliery, Calverton, Nottinghamshire
- 1936 The Great Mablethorpe Plan, Lincolnshire
- 1942 Houses for munitions workers at Whitchurch, Cardiff, Wales
- 1945 "Corbusian" plan for Wolverton (since 1967, part of Milton Keynes)
- 1947 Plan for Hemel Hempstead, Hertfordshire
- 1951–52 East Housing Site, Lansbury Estate, Poplar
- 1952 Church Hill Memorial Garden, Walsall, West Midlands
- 1956 Harvey's Store roof garden, Guildford, Surrey
- 1957–59 Water Gardens, Hemel Hempstead, Hertfordshire
- 1959 Cliveden Rose Garden, Taplow, Buckinghamshire
- 1955–68 Glass Age Development Committee, sponsored by Pilkington Glass with Edward D. Mills and Ove Arup & Partners. Projects included Motopia, the Crystal Span Bridge, plans for Soho, Sea City and others.
- 1964–65 Kennedy Memorial Garden, Runnymede, Surrey
- 1970–90 Shute House, Donhead St Mary, Wiltshire – extensive gardens, his last work, his favourite, and considered to be his finest
- 1972–90 St Paul's Walden Bury, Hertfordshire – garden restoration and additions
- 1979–89 Hartwell House Garden, Buckinghamshire
- 1980–86 Sutton Place Garden, Surrey
- 1984 Moody Gardens, Galveston, Texas, USA

== Books and other publications ==
- Italian Gardens of the Renaissance (with J.C. Shepherd) (1926)
- Baroque Gardens of Austria (1932)
- The Shakespeare Memorial Theatre, Stratford-upon-Avon, etc. (1933)
- Garden Decoration & Ornament for Smaller Houses (1936)
- Gardens of Europe (1937)
- Report accompanying an Outline Plan for Guildford prepared for the Municipal Borough Council (1945)
- Studies in Landscape Design (1960)
- Motopia: A Study in the Evolution of Urban Landscape (1961)
- A Landscape Plan for Sark (1967)
- The Landscape of Man (1975)
- Blue Circle Cement Hope Works Derbyshire (1980?)
- The Guelph Lectures on Landscape Design (1983)
- The Oxford Companion to Gardens (1986)
- The Landscape of Civilisation (1989)
- The Studies of a Landscape Designer over 80 years (c.1993)
- Gardens & Design, Gardens of Europe (1995)
