= Vauxhall Bridge =

Arch bridge in central London

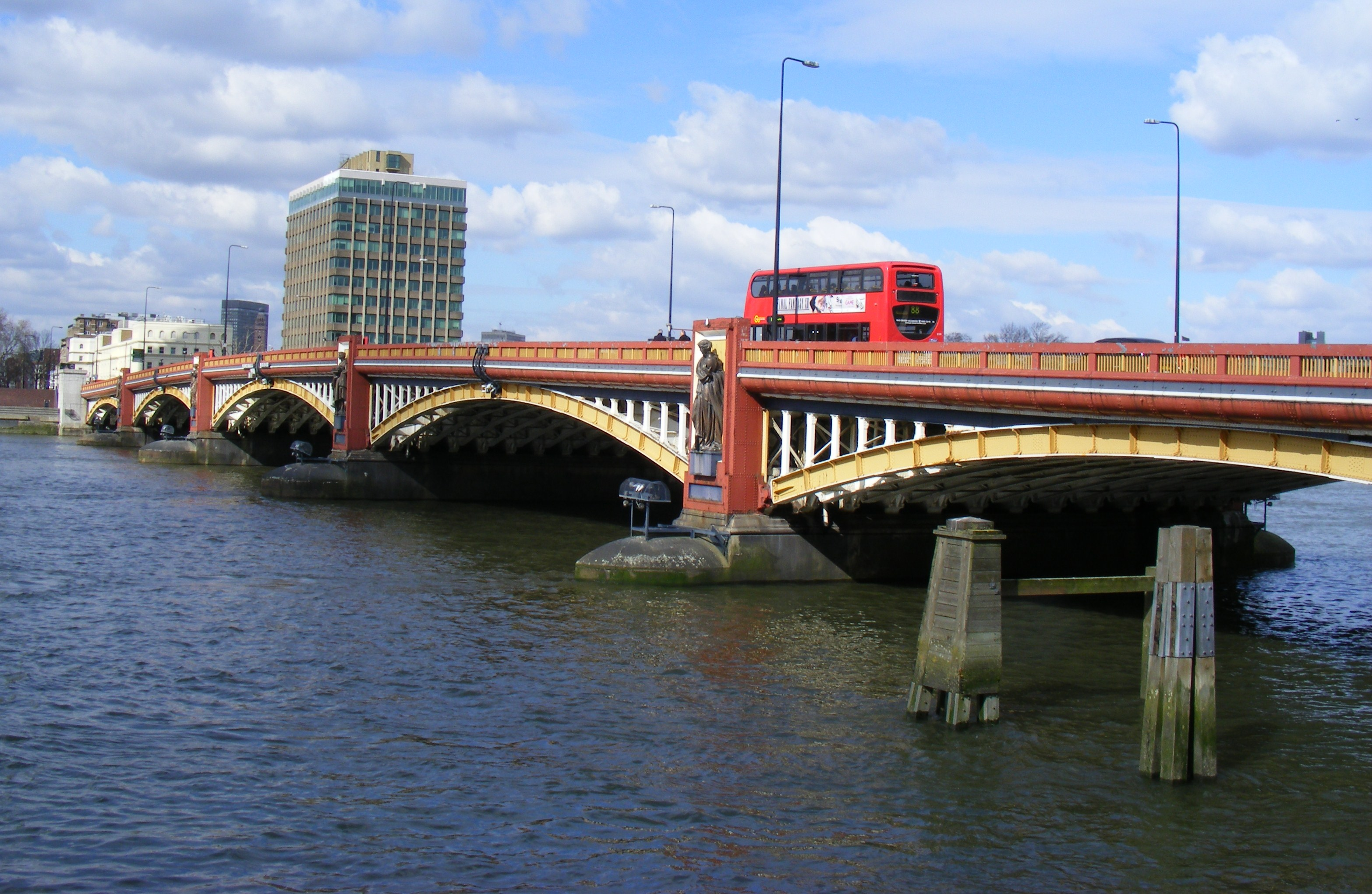
- Coordinates: 51°29′15″N 0°07′37″W
- Carries: A202 road
- Crosses: River Thames
- Locale: London
- Maintained by: Transport for London
- Heritage status: Grade II* listed
- Preceded by: Grosvenor Railway Bridge
- Followed by: Lambeth Bridge

Characteristics
- Design: Arch bridge
- Material: Steel and granite
- Total length: 809 feet (247 m)
- Width: 80 feet (24 m)
- No. of spans: 5
- Piers in water: 4
- Clearance below: 39 feet 9 inches (12.1 m) at lowest astronomical tide

History
- Designer: Sir Alexander Binnie, Sir Maurice Fitzmaurice
- Opened: 26 May 1906; 120 years ago
- Replaces: Regent Bridge (Old Vauxhall Bridge) 1816–98

Statistics
- Daily traffic: 50,533 vehicles (2004)

Location
- Interactive map of Vauxhall Bridge

Vauxhall Bridge is a Grade II* listed steel and granite deck arch bridge in central London. It crosses the River Thames in a southeast–northwest direction between Vauxhall on the south bank and Pimlico on the north bank. Opened in 1906, it replaced an earlier bridge, originally known as Regent Bridge but later renamed Vauxhall Bridge, built between 1809 and 1816 as part of a scheme for redeveloping the south bank of the Thames. The bridge was built at a location in the river previously served by a ferry.

The building of both iterations of the bridge was problematic, with both the first and second bridges requiring several redesigns from multiple architects. The original bridge, the first iron bridge over the Thames, was built by a private company and operated as a toll bridge before being taken into public ownership in 1879. The second bridge, which took eight years to build, was the first in London to carry trams and later one of the first two roads in London to have a bus lane.

In 1963 it was proposed to replace the bridge with a modern development containing seven floors of shops, office space, hotel rooms and leisure facilities supported above the river, but the plans were abandoned because of costs. With the exception of alterations to the road layout and the balustrade, the design and appearance of the current bridge has remained almost unchanged since 1907. The bridge today is an important part of London's road system and carries the A202 road and Cycle Superhighway 5 (CS5) across the Thames.

== Background ==
In the early 13th century, Anglo-Norman mercenary Falkes de Breauté built a manor house in the then empty marshlands of South Lambeth, across the River Thames from Westminster. In 1223–24, de Breauté and others revolted against Henry III; following a failed attempt to seize the Tower of London, de Breauté's lands in England were forfeited and he was forced into exile in France and later Rome. The lands surrounding his Lambeth manor house continued to be known as Falkes' Hall, later Vauxhall. (Note: The popular belief that the name derives from Guy Fawkes is based on a misconception; Fawkes' co-conspirator Robert Catesby owned a house in Lambeth, but Fawkes had no connection with the area.)

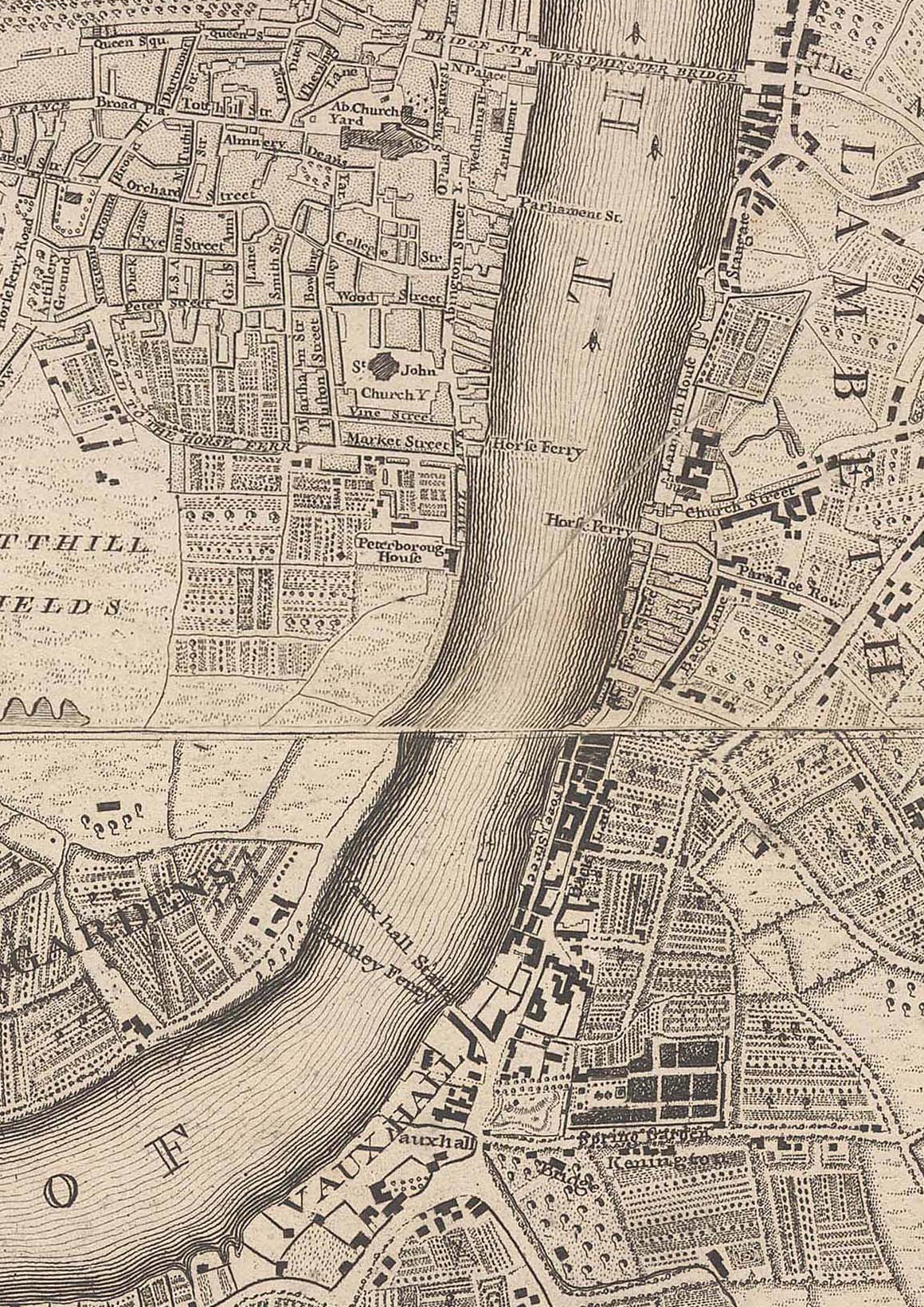
Westminster & Lambeth, 1746. Westminster Bridge, opened in 1740, connects Westminster to Lambeth; Huntley Ferry crosses the river on the site of the future Vauxhall Bridge.

With the exception of housing around the New Spring Gardens (later Vauxhall Gardens) pleasure park, opened in around 1661, the land at Vauxhall remained sparsely populated into the 19th century, with the nearest fixed river crossings being the bridges at Westminster, 1 mile (1.6 km) downstream, and Battersea, 2 miles (3.2 km) upstream. In 1806 a scheme was proposed by Ralph Dodd to open the south bank of the Thames for development, by building a new major road from Hyde Park Corner to Kennington and Greenwich, crossing the river upstream of the existing Westminster Bridge. The proprietors of Battersea Bridge, concerned about a potential loss of customers, petitioned Parliament against the scheme, stating that "[Dodd] is a well known adventurer and Speculist, and the projector of numerous undertakings upon a large scale most if not all of which have failed", (Note: Dodd had been involved in many unsuccessful transport schemes. Between 1799 and 1803 he attempted to drive a tunnel beneath the Thames between Tilbury and Gravesend. A plan to dig a canal between London and Epsom was abandoned after reaching Peckham, three miles away. He provided the original designs for the new Waterloo and London Bridges, both of which were taken over by John Rennie, while his design for Hammersmith Bridge had to be suspended when the owners of a strip of land blocking the approach road refused to sell it to the bridge company.) and the bill was abandoned.

Vauxhall Bridge Act 1809
- Act of Parliament
- Parliament of the United Kingdom
- Long title: An Act for building a Bridge across the River Thames, from or near Vauxhall Turnpike, in the Parish of Saint Mary Lambeth, in the County of Surrey, to the opposite Shore, in the Parish of Saint John, in the City and Liberty of Westminster, and County of Middlesex, and for making convenient Roads thereto.
- Citation: 49 Geo. 3. c. cxlii

Dates
- Royal assent: 3 June 1809
Other legislation
Repealed by	Local Law (Greater London Council and Inner London Boroughs) Order 1965 (SI 1965/540)

Text of statute as originally enacted

In 1809 a new bill was presented to Parliament, and the proprietors of Battersea Bridge agreed to allow it to pass and to accept compensation. The Vauxhall Bridge Act 1809 (49 Geo. 3. c. cxlii) incorporated the Vauxhall Bridge Company, allowing it to raise up to £300,000 (about £21 million in 2025) by means of mortgages or the sale of shares, and to keep all profits from any tolls raised. From these profits, the Vauxhall Bridge Company was obliged to compensate the proprietors of Battersea Bridge for any drop in revenue caused by the new bridge.

The Act required the Company to create approach roads to the bridge, most notably on the Middlesex side to Eaton Street. This has since been renamed: it is now the section of Victoria Street which runs west from Vauxhall Bridge Road to the junction with what is now called Grosvenor Gardens. This gave access to Hyde Park Corner and so to roads to the north. The Company was therefore responsible for building the whole of Vauxhall Bridge Road and the part of Victoria Street in front of Victoria Station.

== Old Vauxhall Bridge ==
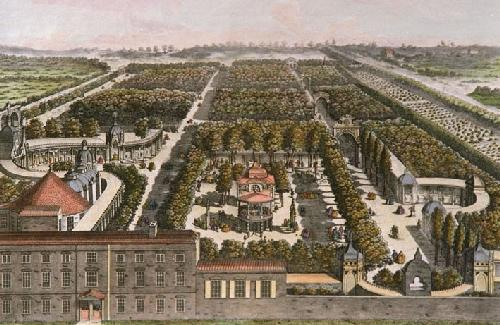
New Spring Gardens, 1751

Dodd submitted a scheme for a bridge at Vauxhall of 13 arches. However, soon after the Vauxhall Bridge Act 1809 was passed, he was dismissed by the Vauxhall Bridge Company and his design was abandoned. John Rennie was commissioned to design and build the new bridge, and a stone bridge of seven arches was approved. On 9 May 1811, Lord Dundas laid the foundation stone of the bridge on the northern bank.

Vauxhall Bridge and Approaches Act 1812
- Act of Parliament
- Parliament of the United Kingdom
- Long title: An Act for altering and enlarging the Powers of an Act of His present Majesty, for erecting a Bridge across the River Thames, near Vauxhall and making Roads thereto in the Counties of Middlesex and Surrey.
- Citation: 52 Geo. 3. c. cxlvii

Dates
- Royal assent: 9 June 1812
Other legislation
Repealed by	Local Law (Greater London Council and Inner London Boroughs) Order 1965 (SI 1965/540)

Status: Repealed

Text of statute as originally enacted

The Vauxhall Bridge Company ran into financial difficulties and was unable to raise more than the £300,000 stipulated in the 1809 act, and a new Vauxhall Bridge and Approaches Act 1812 (52 Geo. 3. c. cxlvii) was passed permitting the company to build a cheaper iron bridge. Rennie submitted a new design for an iron bridge of eleven spans, costing far less than the original stone design. Rennie's design was rejected, and instead construction began on a nine arch iron bridge designed by Samuel Bentham. Concerns were raised about the construction of the piers, and engineer James Walker was appointed to inspect the work. Walker's report led to the design being abandoned for the second time, and Walker himself was appointed to design and build a bridge of nine 78-foot (24 m) cast-iron arches with stone piers, the first iron bridge to be built across the Thames.

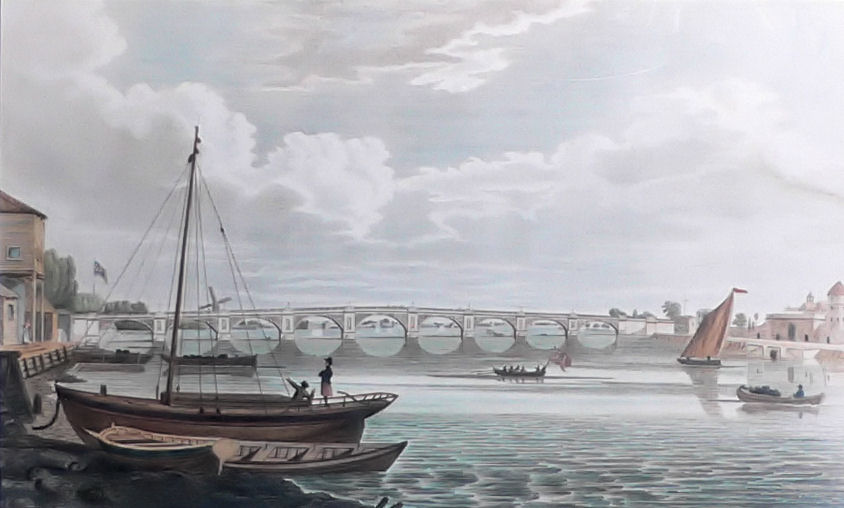
Regent Bridge shortly after opening

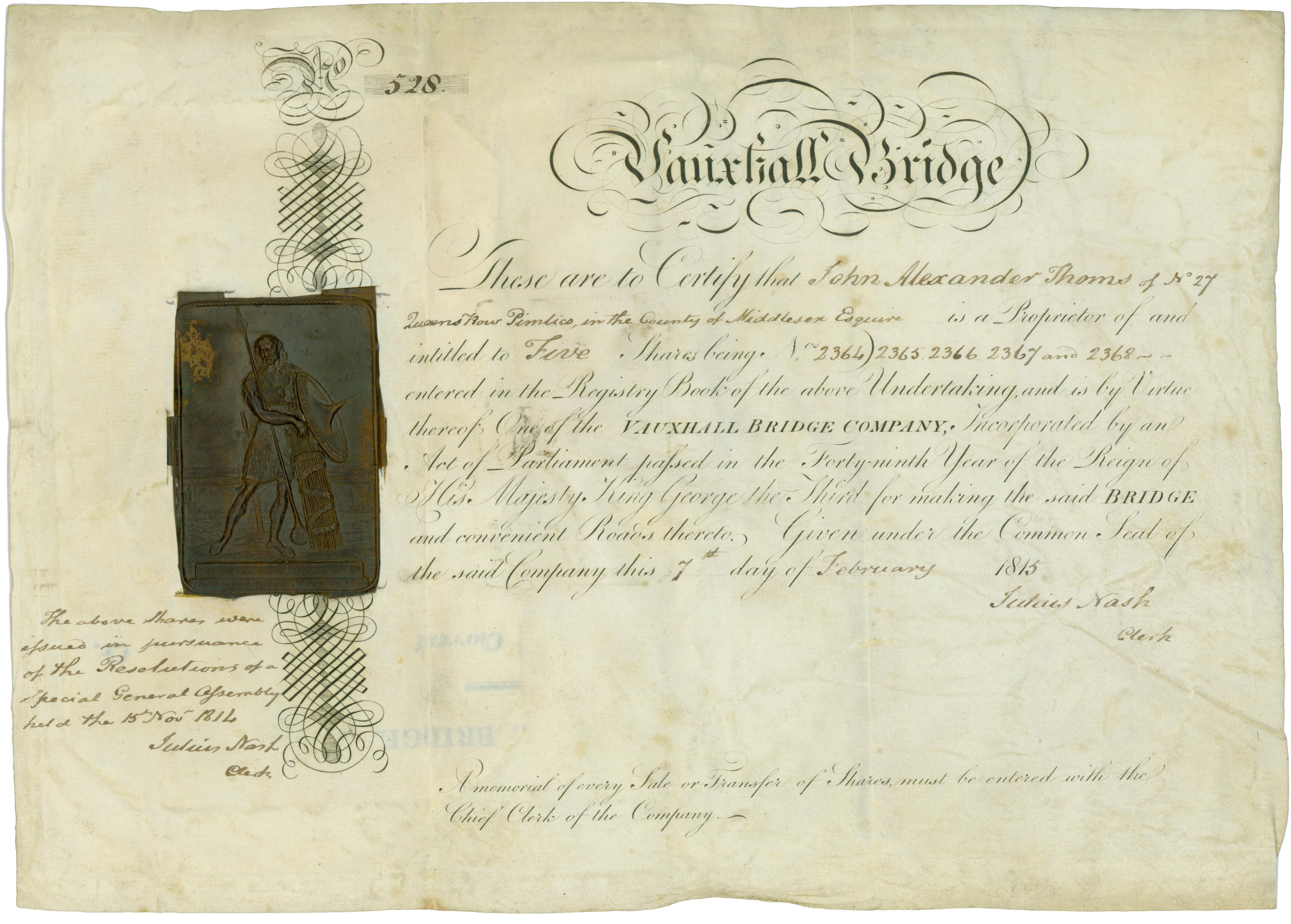
Share of the Vauxhall Bridge Company, issued 7. February 1815

On 4 June 1816, over five years after construction began, the bridge opened, initially named Regent Bridge after George, Prince Regent, but shortly afterwards renamed Vauxhall Bridge. The developers failed to pay the agreed compensation to the owners of Battersea Bridge and were taken to court; after a legal dispute lasting five years a judgement was made in favour of Battersea Bridge, with Vauxhall Bridge being obliged to pay £8,234 (about £782,000 in 2025) compensation. As well as the compensation awarded by the courts to Battersea Bridge in 1821, the Vauxhall Bridge Act 1809 also obliged the Vauxhall Bridge Company to pay compensation to the operators of Huntley Ferry, the Sunday ferry service to Vauxhall Gardens, with the level to be decided by "a jury of 24 honest, sufficient and indifferent men". The bridge cost £175,000 (about £14.7 million in 2025) to build; with the costs of approach roads and compensation payments, the total cost came to £297,000 (about £25 million in 2025).

=== Usage ===
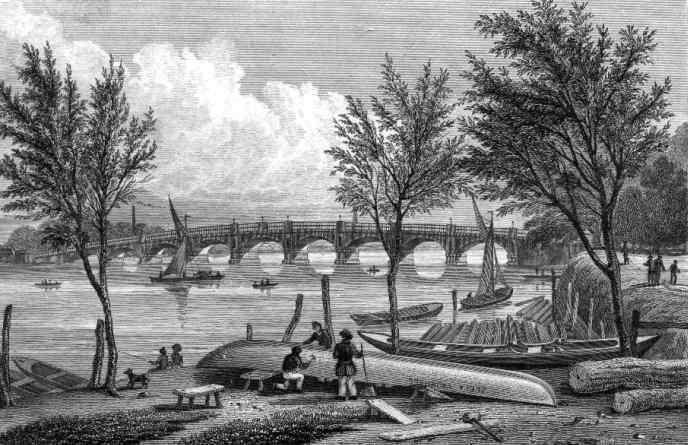
Vauxhall Bridge in 1829

In anticipation of the areas surrounding the bridge becoming prosperous suburbs, tolls were set at relatively high rates on a sliding scale, ranging from a penny for pedestrians to 2s 6d for vehicles drawn by six horses. Exemptions were granted for mail coaches, soldiers on duty and parliamentary candidates during election campaigns. However, the area around the bridge failed to develop as expected. In 1815 John Doulton built the Doulton & Watts (later Royal Doulton) stoneware factory at Vauxhall, and consequently instead of the wealthy residents anticipated by the company, the area began to fill with narrow streets of working class tenements to house the factory's workers. Meanwhile, the large Millbank Penitentiary was built near the northern end of the bridge, discouraging housing development. Consequently, toll revenues were initially lower than expected, and the dividends paid to investors were low.

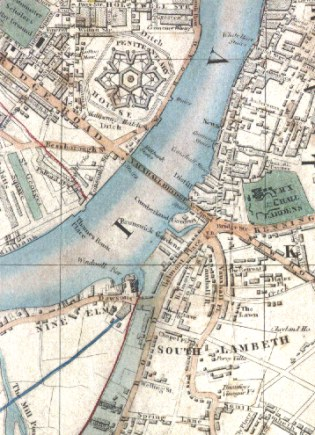
Vauxhall Bridge and Nine Elms station in 1847

Usage rose considerably in 1838 when the terminus of the London and South Western Railway was built at nearby Nine Elms. Nine Elms station proved inconvenient and unpopular with travellers, and in 1848 a new railway terminus was built 1 1/2 miles (2.4 km) closer to central London, at Waterloo Bridge station (renamed "Waterloo Station" in 1886), and the terminus at Nine Elms was abandoned.

With the closure of the rail terminus, Vauxhall Bridge's main source of revenue was visitors to the Vauxhall Gardens pleasure park. In addition to people visiting the Gardens themselves, Vauxhall Gardens were used as a launch point for hot air balloon flights, and large crowds would gather on the bridge and surrounding streets to watch the flights. (Note: In the 1990s sightseeing balloon flights from Vauxhall Gardens – by then renamed back to Spring Gardens – were resumed. The service closed in 2001 following the opening of the nearby London Eye.) A large crowd also assembled on the bridge in September 1844 to watch Mister Barry, a clown from Astley's Amphitheatre, sail from Vauxhall Bridge to Westminster Bridge in a washtub towed by geese.

=== Public ownership ===
Despite early setbacks and the construction nearby in the 19th century of three competing bridges (Lambeth Bridge, Chelsea Bridge and Albert Bridge), the rapid urban growth of London made Vauxhall Bridge very profitable. The annual income from tolls rose from £4,977 (about £369,000 in 2025) in its first full year of operation, to £62,392 in 1877 (about £6,289,000 in 2025). The Metropolis Toll Bridges Act 1877 (40 & 41 Vict. c. xcix) was passed, allowing the Metropolitan Board of Works (MBW) to buy all London bridges between Hammersmith Bridge and Waterloo Bridge and free them from tolls.

London County Council (Vauxhall Bridge) Act 1895
- Act of Parliament
- Parliament of the United Kingdom
- Long title: An Act to empower the London County Council to rebuild Vauxhall Bridge and to execute other works in connexion therewith.
- Citation: 58 & 59 Vict. c. cxxix

Dates
- Royal assent: 6 July 1895

Text of statute as originally enacted

In 1879 the bridge was bought by the MBW for £255,000 (about £27,400,000 in 2025) and tolls on the bridge were lifted. Inspections of the bridge by the MBW following the purchase found that the two central piers were badly eroded, exposing the timber cradles on which the piers rested. Large quantities of cement in bags were laid around the wooden cradles as an emergency measure; however, the cement bags themselves soon washed away. The piers were removed, replaced by a single large central arch. By this time the bridge was in very poor condition, and in 1895 the London County Council (LCC), which had taken over from the MBW in 1889, sought and gained parliamentary approval to replace the bridge, in the London County Council (Vauxhall Bridge) Act 1895 (58 & 59 Vict. c. cxxix). Permission was granted by Parliament to raise the projected replacement costs of £484,000 (about £55,020,000 in 2025) from rates across the whole of London rather than only local residents, as a new bridge was considered to be of benefit to the whole of London.

== New Vauxhall Bridge ==
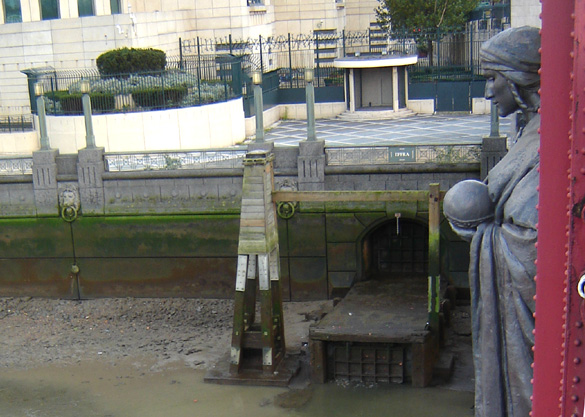
Diverted outflow of the River Effra into the Thames, beneath Drury's Science

Sir Alexander Binnie, the resident engineer of the London County Council (LCC), submitted a design for a steel bridge, which proved unpopular. At the request of the LCC, Binnie submitted a new design for a bridge of five spans, to be built in concrete and faced with granite.

Work on Binnie's design began, but was beset by problems. Leading architects condemned the design, with Arthur Beresford Pite describing it as "a would-be Gothic architectural form of great vulgarity and stupid want of meaning", and T G Jackson describing the bridge designs as a sign of "the utter apparent indifference of those in authority to the matter of art". Plans to build large stone abutments had to be suspended when it was found that the southern abutment would block the River Effra, which by this time had been diverted underground to serve as a storm relief sewer and which flowed into the Thames at this point. The Effra had to be rerouted to join the Thames to the north of the bridge. (Note: The River Tyburn also joins the Thames near Vauxhall Bridge, 200 yards (180 m) upstream of the bridge on the northern bank.) After the construction of the foundations and piers it was then discovered that the clay of the riverbed at this point would not be able to support the weight of a concrete bridge. With the granite piers already in place, it was decided to build a steel superstructure onto the existing piers, and a superstructure 809 feet (247 m) long and 80 feet (24 m) wide was designed by Binnie and Maurice Fitzmaurice and built by LCC engineers at a cost of £437,000 (about £45,940,000 in 2025).

The new bridge was eventually opened on 26 May 1906, five years behind schedule, in a ceremony presided over by the Prince of Wales and Evan Spicer, Chairman of the LCC. Charles Wall, who had won the contract to build the superstructure of the new bridge, paid the LCC £50 for the temporary wooden bridge, comprising 40,000 cubic feet (1,100 m^{3}) of timber and 580 tons of scrap metal.

=== Sculpture ===
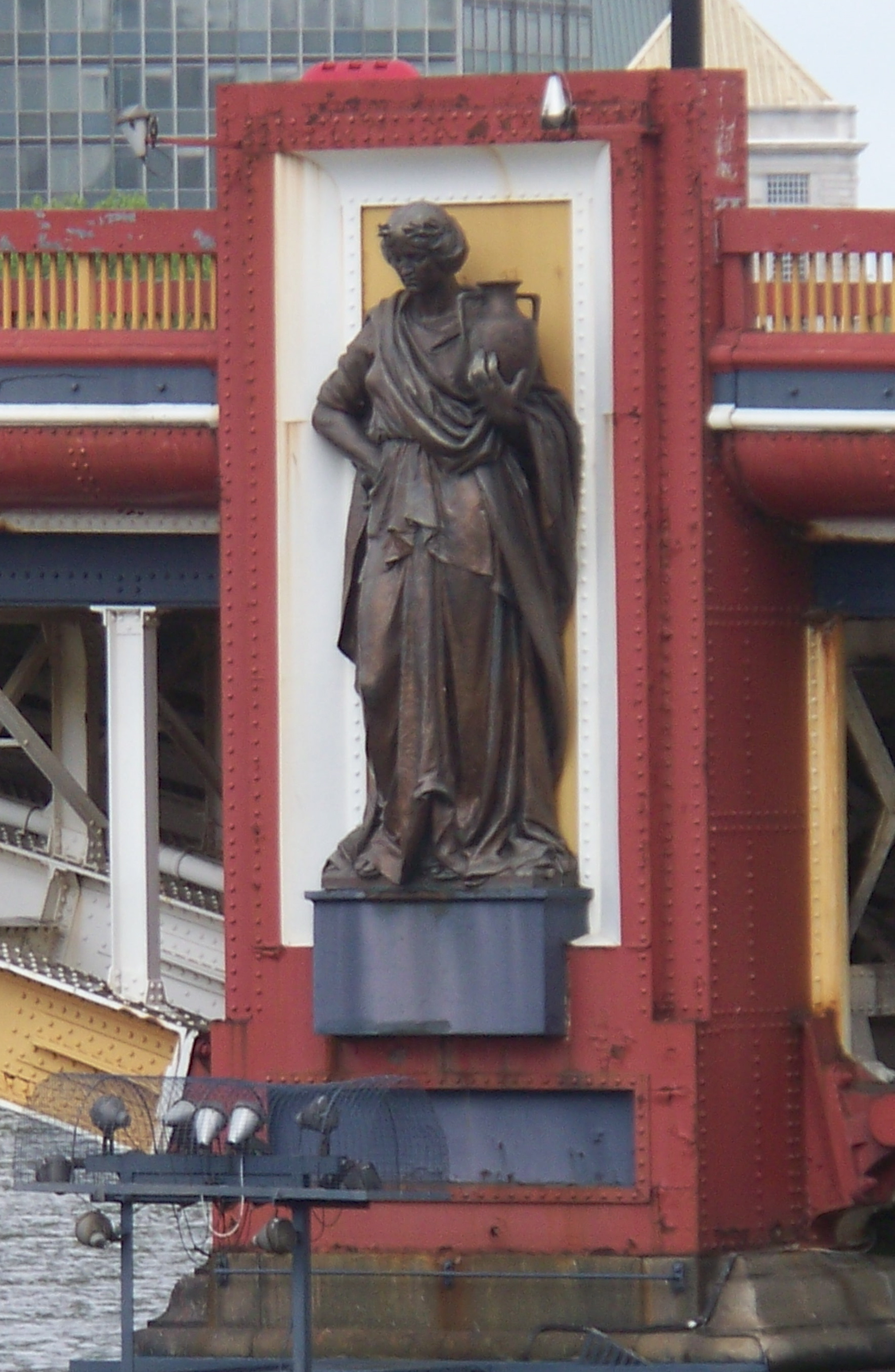
Pomeroy's Pottery

The new bridge was built to a starkly functional design, and many influential architects had complained about the lack of consultation from any architects during the design process by the engineers designing the new bridge. In 1903, during the construction of the bridge, the LCC consulted with architect William Edward Riley regarding possible decorative elements that could be added to the bridge. Riley proposed erecting two 60-foot (18 m) pylons topped with statues at one end of the bridge, and adding decorative sculpture to the bridge piers. The pylons were rejected on grounds of cost, but following further consultation with leading architect Richard Norman Shaw it was decided to erect monumental bronze statues above the piers, and Alfred Drury, George Frampton and Frederick Pomeroy were appointed to design appropriate statues.

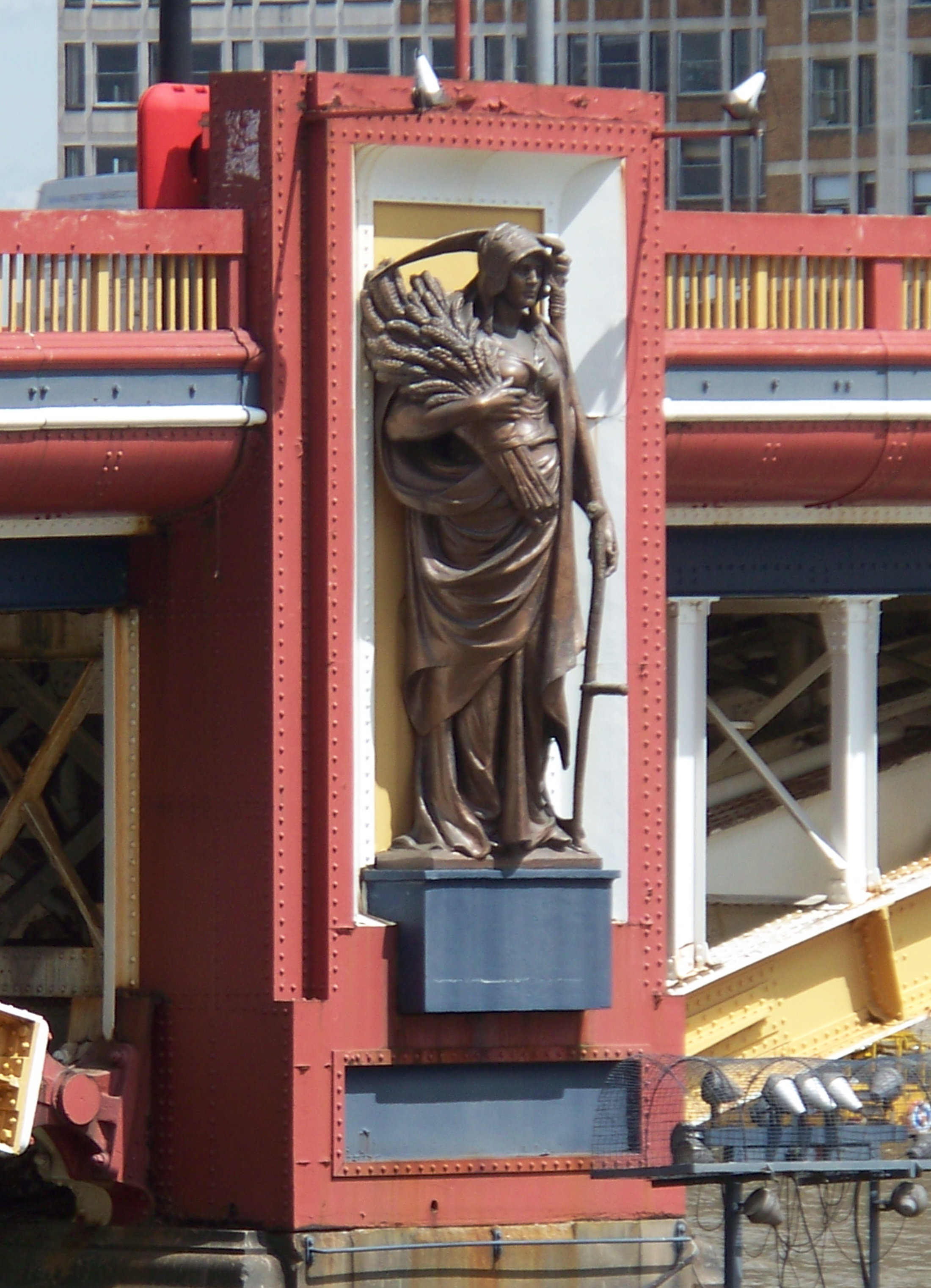
Pomeroy's Agriculture

Frampton resigned from the project through pressure of work, and Drury and Pomeroy carried out the project, each contributing four monumental statues, which were installed in late 1907. On the upstream piers are Pomeroy's Agriculture, Architecture, Engineering and Pottery, whilst on the downstream piers are Drury's Science, Fine Arts, Local Government and Education. Each statue weighs approximately two tons. Despite their size, the statues are little-noticed by users of the bridge as they are not visible from the bridge itself, but only from the river banks or from passing shipping.

=== Usage ===
The new bridge soon became a major transport artery and today carries the A202 and Cycle Superhighway 5 across the Thames. Originally built with tram tracks, New Vauxhall Bridge was the first in central London to carry trams. Initially it carried horse-drawn trams, but shortly after the bridge's opening it was converted to carry the electric trams of London County Council Tramways; it continued to carry trams until the termination of tram services in 1951. In 1968 Vauxhall Bridge and Park Lane became the first roads in London to have bus lanes; during weekday evening rush hours, the central lane of the bridge was reserved for buses from Westminster to Lambeth.

== Millbank Bridge ==
Before Old Vauxhall Bridge was demolished, a temporary wooden bridge was erected between the Albert Embankment and Millbank and opened to the public in August 1898. This carried the traffic of the old bridge until New Vauxhall Bridge was opened for traffic in May 1906.

During the Second World War the government was concerned that Axis bombers would target the bridge, and a temporary bridge known as Millbank Bridge was built parallel to Vauxhall Bridge, 200 yards (180 m) downstream. Millbank Bridge was built of steel girders supported by wooden stakes; however, despite its flimsy appearance it was a sturdy structure, capable of supporting tanks and other heavy military equipment. In the event, Vauxhall Bridge survived the war undamaged, and in 1948 Millbank Bridge was dismantled. Its girders were shipped to Northern Rhodesia and used to span a tributary of the Zambezi.

== The Crystal Span ==
In 1963 the Glass Age Development Committee commissioned a design for a replacement bridge at Vauxhall, inspired by the design of the Crystal Palace, to be called the Crystal Span. The Crystal Span was to have been a seven-story building supported by two piers in the river, overhanging the river banks at either end. The structure itself would have been enclosed in an air conditioned glass shell. The lowest floor would have contained two three-lane carriageways for vehicles, with a layer of shops and a skating rink in the centre of the upper floors. The southern end of the upper floors was to house a luxury hotel, whilst the northern end was to house the modern art collection of the nearby Tate Gallery, which at this time was suffering from a severe shortage of display space. The roof was to have housed a series of roof gardens, observation platforms and courtyards, surrounding a large open-air theatre. The entire structure would have been 970 feet (300 m) long and 127 feet (39 m) wide. Despite much public interest in the proposals, the London County Council was reluctant to pay the estimated £7 million (£128 million in 2025) construction costs, and the scheme was abandoned.

== Recent history ==
In 1993, a remnant of the earliest known bridge-like structure in London was discovered alongside Vauxhall Bridge, when shifting currents washed away a layer of silt which had covered it. Dating to between 1550 BC and 300 BC, it consists of two rows of wooden posts, which it is believed would originally have carried a deck of some kind. It is believed that it did not cross the whole river, but instead connected the south bank to an island, possibly used for burial of the dead. As no mention of this or similar structures in the area is made in Julius Caesar's account of crossing the Thames nor by any other Roman author, it is presumed that the structure had been dismantled or destroyed prior to Caesar's expedition to Britain in 55 BC. The posts are still visible at extreme low tides.

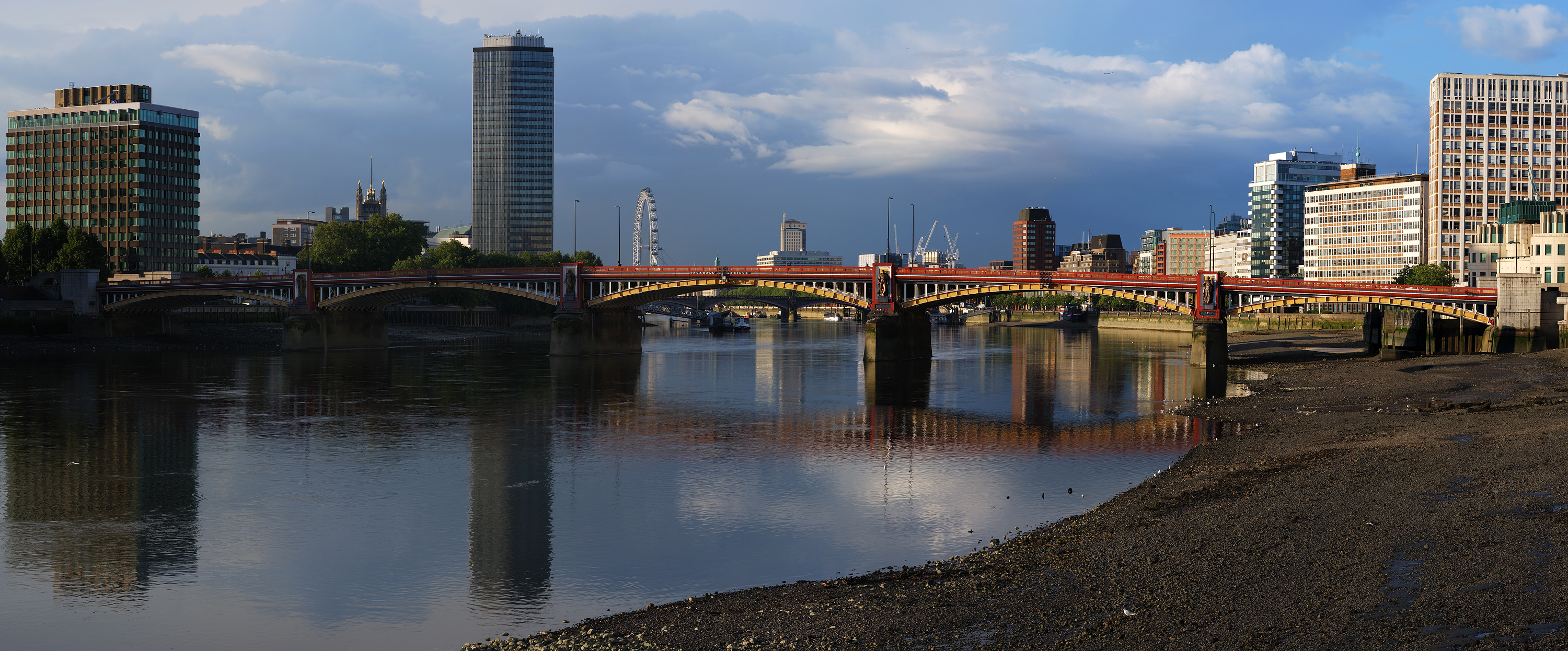
2009 view of Vauxhall Bridge, from upstream on the south bank

Following the closure of a number of the area's industries, in the 1970s and 1980s the land at the southern end of Vauxhall Bridge remained empty, following the failures of multiple redevelopment schemes. The most notable came in 1979 when Keith Wickenden MP, owner of the land at the immediate southern end of the bridge, proposed a large-scale redevelopment of the site. The development was to contain 300,000 square feet (28,000 m^{2}) of office space, 100 luxury flats and a gallery to house the Tate Gallery's modern art collection. The offices were to be housed in a 500-foot (150 m) tower of green glass, which was nicknamed the "Green Giant" and met with much opposition. The then Secretary of State for the Environment, Michael Heseltine, refused permission for the development and the site remained empty.

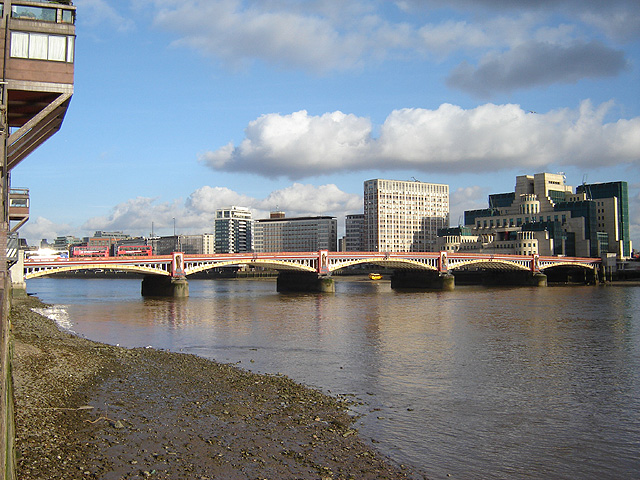
The SIS Building now dominates the southern end of the bridge.

In 1988 Regalian Properties purchased the site, and appointed Terry Farrell as architect. Farrell designed a self-contained community of shops, housing, offices and public spaces for the site. Regalian disliked the proposals and requested Farrell design a single large office block. Despite containing 50% more office space than the rejected Green Giant proposal, the design was accepted. The government then bought the site and design as a future headquarters for the Secret Intelligence Service, and the design was accordingly modified to increase security. In 1995 the SIS Building was opened on the site, and today dominates other buildings in the vicinity of the bridge.

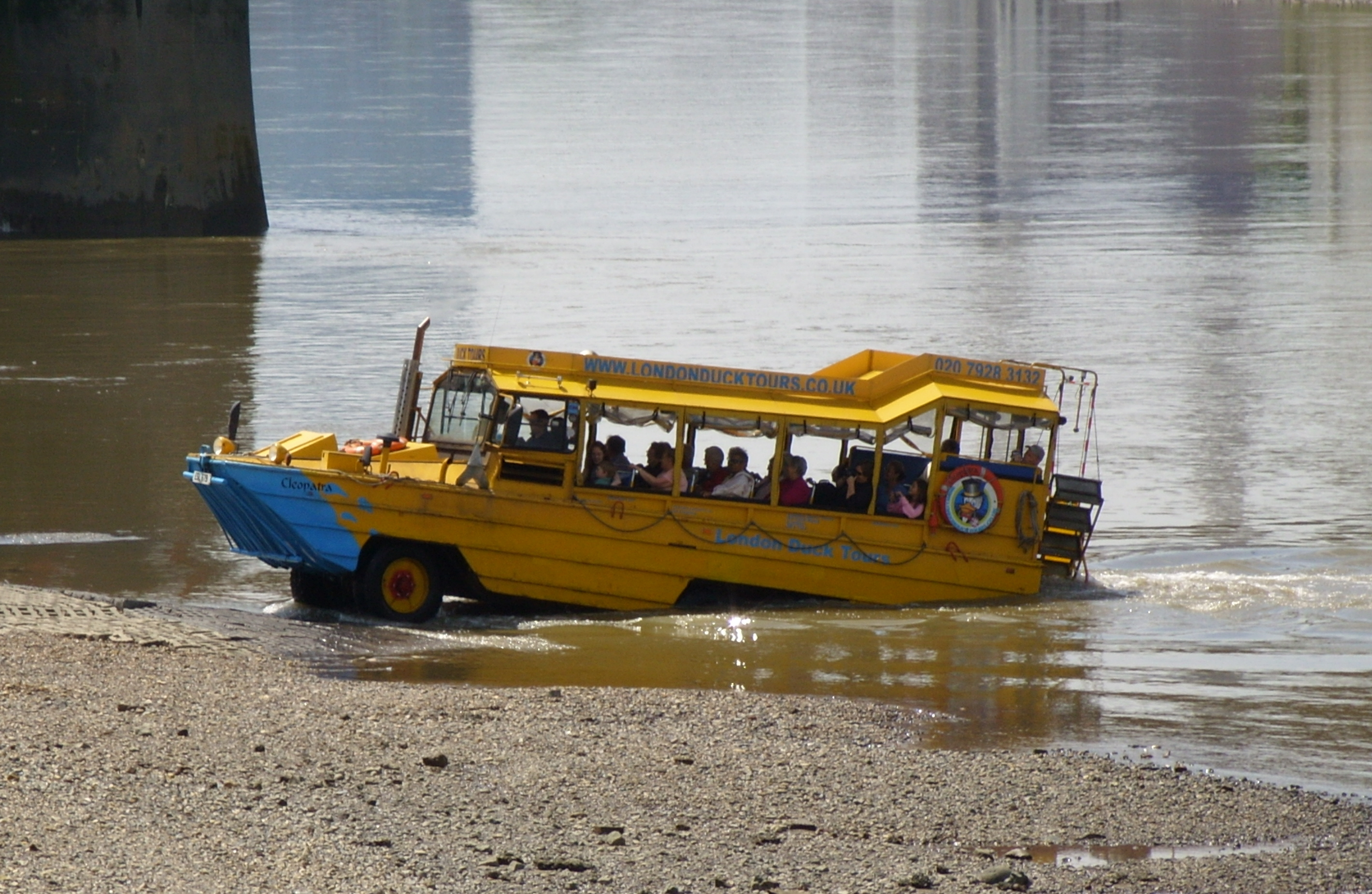
A slipway on the south bank is used by amphibious buses.

In 2004 the Vauxhall Cross area at the southern end of the bridge was redeveloped as a major transport interchange, combining a large bus station with the existing National Rail and London Underground stations at Vauxhall. Immediately to the east of the southern end of the bridge, a slipway provides access for amphibious buses between the road and river.

The only significant alteration to the structure of the bridge itself since the addition of the sculptures in 1907 came in 1973, when the Greater London Council (GLC) decided to add an extra traffic lane by reducing the width of the pavements. To counter the increased load of extra traffic, the council announced the replacement of the cast-iron balustrades with low box-girder structures. Despite formal objections from both Lambeth and Westminster Councils, the GLC ignored the objections. In 2015, the extra lane of motor traffic was removed in favour of a kerb-protected two-way cycle track, on the north-east side of the bridge. This forms part of Cycle Superhighway 5.

The bridge was declared a Grade II* listed structure in 2008, providing protection to preserve its character from alteration.

== See also ==
- List of crossings of the River Thames
- List of bridges in London

== Notes and references ==
=== Bibliography ===
- Carpenter, David (2003), The Struggle for Mastery, Oxford University Press US, ISBN 0-19-522000-5, OCLC 52594503
- Cookson, Brian (2006), Crossing the River, Edinburgh: Mainstream, ISBN 1-84018-976-2, OCLC 63400905
- De Maré, Eric (1954), Bridges of Britain (2nd (1975) ed.), London: Batsford, ISBN 0-7134-2925-9, OCLC 255670618
- Jeremiah, David (2000), Architecture and Design for the Family in Britain 1900–70, Manchester: Manchester University Press, ISBN 0-7190-5889-9, OCLC 186445752
- Matthews, Peter (2008), London's Bridges, Oxford: Shire, ISBN 978-0-7478-0679-0, OCLC 213309491
- Murray, Peter; Stevens, Mary Anne; Cadman, David (1996), Living Bridges: the inhabited bridge, past, present and future, London: Royal Academy of Arts, ISBN 3-7913-1734-2, OCLC 36113250
- Skempton, Sir Alec, ed. (2002), Biographical Directory of Civil Engineers, vol. 1, London: Thomas Telford, ISBN 0-7277-2939-X
- Timbs, John (1855), Curiosities of London, London: David Bogue, OCLC 3807583
