= Chewton Glen =

Hotel and spa in Hampshire, England

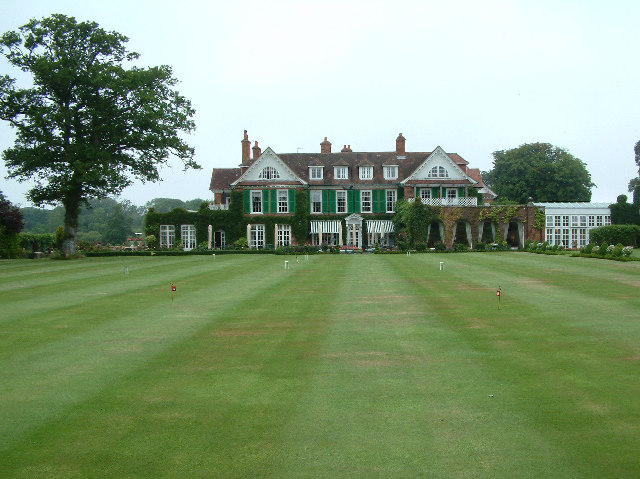
- View of Chewton Glen from the croquet lawn

- Location within Hampshire Location within England
- Hotel chain: Iconic Hotels & Resorts

General information
- Location: Christchurch Road; New Milton, Hampshire, UK
- Coordinates: 50.745784°N 1.681327°W
- Opened: 1966
- Owner: L+R
- Affiliation: Relais & Châteaux

Technical details
- Floor count: 3

Other information
- Number of rooms: 35
- Number of suites: 35
- Number of restaurants: 2 (The Dining Room and Pool Bar)
- Facilities: Spa, Fitness Centre, Free Wi-Fi, Laundry Service, Hot Tub, Golf Course, Room Service, Air-conditioned, Smoke-free
- Parking: Free Parking

Website
- chewtonglen.com

Chewton Glen is a five-star hotel and spa located on the edge of the New Forest National Park on the south coast of England. It is a member of the Relais & Châteaux association and is part of the Iconic Hotels & Resorts group, which includes Cliveden House, 11 Cadogan Gardens and The Lygon Arms.

== History ==
Historic documents suggest that the house was originally built in the eighteenth century, with the first recorded mention of 'Chewton Glen House' appearing in 1732.

Captain Frederick Marryat stayed here during the 1840s while he wrote the novel The Children of the New Forest. Marryat's brother, George, owned the property from 1837 until 1855.

In 1947, the Duval (or Devall) family bought the house, the nearby farm, stables, and 120 hectares of land, and restored the old buildings. They converted the property into a hotel in 1962. Martin Skan and his brother Trevor bought the hotel in 1966. At the time, only two rooms had their own bathroom, but within a few years they modernised the hotel with new kitchens, a lounge, a dining room and 45 hotel rooms, each with a private bath. Within ten years the hotel had an international reputation, and the Skans remained proprietors for 40 years.

In 2007, Chewton Glen was bought by the property magnate Ian Livingstone. It has since become one of many hotels owned by London & Regional, a property company which Livingstone founded with his brother, Richard Livingstone, in 1987.

In 2010, the hotel hosted a charity drive by Chris Evans which raised money for local and national charities, including Children in Need.

== Location ==
Chewton Glen Hotel is in New Milton, Hampshire, on the south coast of England. The name "Chewton Glen" refers to a tree-lined ravine, also known as Chewton Bunny, a short distance south of the hotel.
