= London & Regional Properties =

British real estate and leisure investment firm

London & Regional Properties Limited
- Trade name: L+R
- Type: Private limited company
- Industry: Real estate Private equity
- Founded: 1987; 39 years ago
- Founders: Richard Livingstone; Ian Livingstone
- Headquarters: 55 Baker Street; London, United Kingdom
- Key people: Richard Livingstone; Ian Livingstone (executive co-chairmen); Desmond Taljaard (deputy chairman); Cody Bradshaw (Group CEO); Andy Fish (Group CFO); Joe Pettigrew (Group CCO)
- AUM: £10 billion
- Owners: Richard Livingstone; Ian Livingstone
- Website: www.lrgroup.com

London & Regional Properties Limited (trading as L+R) is a British real estate and leisure investment firm based in London, United Kingdom. It is one of the largest privately held principal investors in Europe, performing private equity style investments in direct property and asset-backed operating businesses.

The firm was founded in 1987 by Richard Livingstone, a chartered surveyor, and his brother Ian, a former optometrist. The brothers are billionaires and are described by the Irish Independent as "secretive". The firm has upwards of £9 billion in assets under management. L+R has business interests in the United Kingdom, Europe, and the Americas.

== Iconic Hotels & Resorts ==
In addition to its property and investment activities, L+R operates a global hotel platform known as Iconic Hotels & Resorts. As of 2026, the portfolio comprises 115 hotels across 11 countries, representing 37 brands and 19 management teams, with a combined asset value of approximately £7 billion.

The group's holdings include landmark assets in the UK, Continental Europe, and the United States – including the following properties:

- 11 Cadogan Gardens – London, England
- Chelsea Townhouse – London, England
- Chewton Glen – New Milton, England
- Cliveden House – Taplow, England
- Lygon Arms – Broadway, England

== Key Appointments ==
In 2025, Cody Bradshaw was appointed Chief Executive Officer (CEO) of L+R Hotels, with responsibility for leading the group's global hotel platform. Joe Pettigrew was named Group Chief Commercial Officer (CCO), overseeing revenue management, sales, marketing, brand, PR, and digital strategy.

== Portfolio ==
The company's portfolio includes:

=== Investments ===
- Atlas Hotels, a hotel real estate and operating company with 46 limited service hotels across the UK
- David Lloyd Leisure, a gym and health club company with 85 locations across the UK and Europe
- London Hilton on Park Lane
- The Trafalgar St. James London
- The Lensbury
- The Empire, Leicester Square
- General Healthcare Group, the UK's leading independent health provider with 67 hospitals
- Atu's real estate portfolio of 271 assets located in Germany
- Diageo's head office in London WC1
- 55 Baker Street, site of Marks & Spencer's former head office
- 90 care homes, formerly managed by Southern Cross until 2011, to be managed by Orchard Care Homes in the North and Minster in the South-East
- Cliveden, purchased from the collapsed Von Essen Hotels group in February 2012. The Livingstones withdrew from parallel negotiations to buy the Royal Crescent hotel.
- Crowne Plaza hotel in Cambridge was bought for more than €45m from the former Sean Quinn Group in August 2012.
- A development of 750 apartments with hotel and leisure facilities at Greenwich Peninsula
- The Panama Pacifico, a US$700 million mini-city on the banks of the Panama Canal
