= The Trafalgar St. James London =

Hotel in Central London

The Trafalgar St. James London, Curio Collection by Hilton
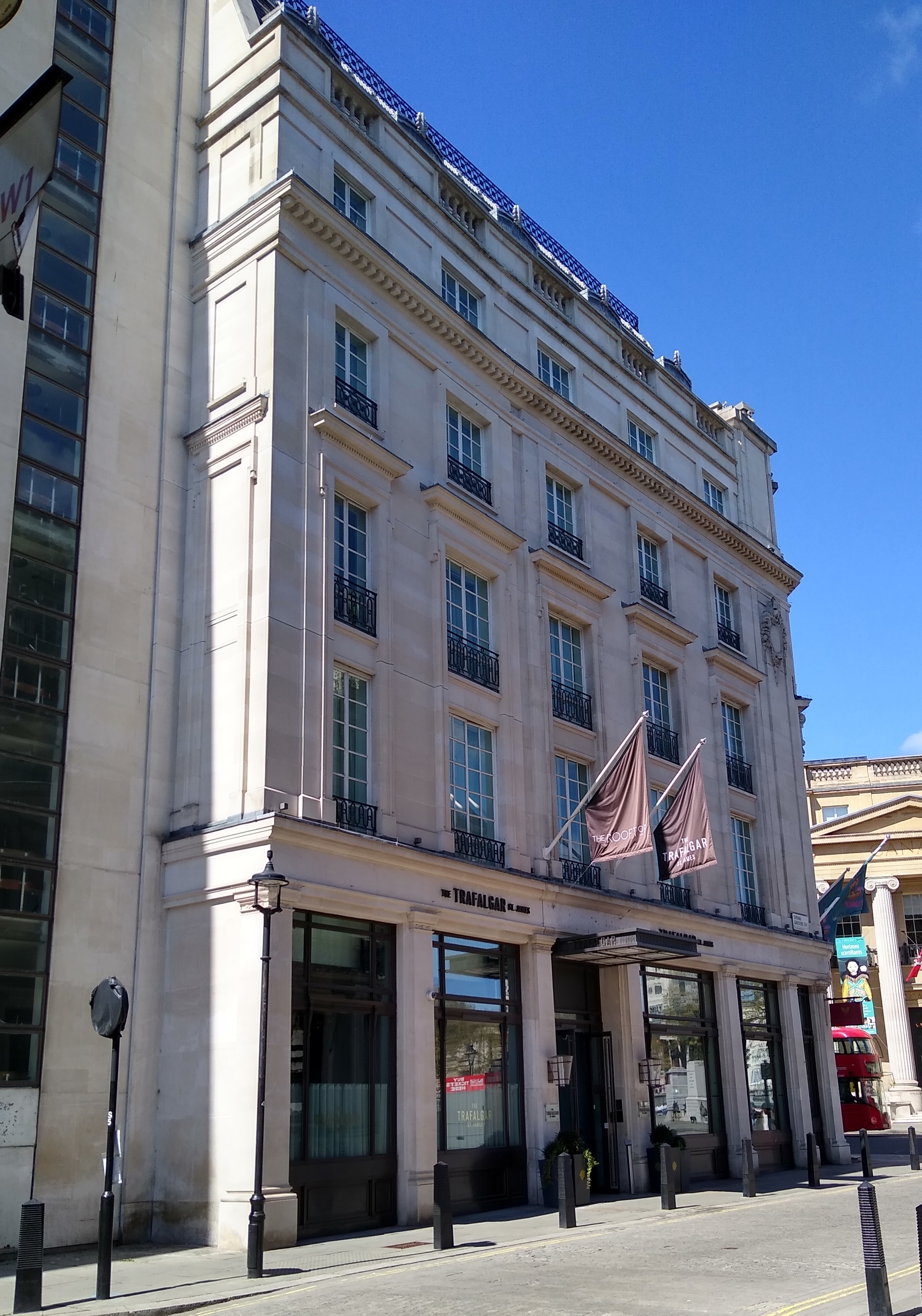

- Location within Central London
- Hotel chain: Curio Collection by Hilton

General information
- Status: Opened
- Type: Hotel
- Classification: 5 stars
- Location: London, SW1 A2TS; United Kingdom, 2 Spring Gardens
- Coordinates: 51.5074°N 0.1293°W
- Opening: 2001
- Owner: London & Regional Properties

Technical details
- Floor count: 6

Design and construction
- Architects: Argent Design and Whinney McKay Lewis

Other information
- Number of rooms: 137
- Number of restaurants: 1

Website
- Official Site

The Trafalgar St. James London, Curio Collection by Hilton is a contemporary boutique hotel located on the south side of Trafalgar Square in the City of Westminster, Central London, owned by London & Regional Properties.

Opened as The Trafalgar London in 2001, the hotel was Hilton's first unbranded property. It was later renamed The Trafalgar Hilton, before being rebranded The Trafalgar St. James London in August 2017, following a refurbishment to designs by SHH Architecture and Interior Design in which the number of rooms was increased to 131.

The historic structure was once used by the Cunard Steamship Company. The boardroom was used in feature films such as Dr. No and The Ipcress File.

The Trafalgar St. James is home to two restaurants including The Rooftop and Rockwell Bistro & Wine Bar.

The hotel was recently refurbished in 2025, adding six new Spring Gardens Suites and renovating all public areas.
