= Cliveden =

Country estate in Buckinghamshire, England

Cliveden House
- View looking north, showing Clock Tower to the left and Borghese Balustrade below

- Location within Buckinghamshire Location within England
- Hotel chain: Iconic Hotels & Resorts

General information
- Location: Taplow, Buckinghamshire, UK
- Coordinates: 51.558168°N 0.688258°W
- Current tenants: London & Regional Hotels (on a long-term lease)
- Completed: 1851
- Owner: National Trust
- Affiliation: Relais & Châteaux

Design and construction
- Architect: Charles Barry
- Main contractor: Lucas Brothers

Other information
- Number of rooms: 47 (including Spring Cottage)
- Number of suites: 15
- Number of restaurants: 2
- Number of bars: 1 (The Library Bar)
- Facilities: Spa, Tennis, Gym, 376 acres (152 ha) of National Trust-Managed Grounds (including the Maze), Two Boats, Meeting Space

Website
- clivedenhouse.co.uk

Cliveden (pronounced /ˈklɪvdən/) is an English country house and estate in the care of the National Trust in Buckinghamshire, on the border with Berkshire. The Italianate mansion, also known as Cliveden House, crowns an outlying ridge of the Chiltern Hills close to the South Bucks villages of Taplow and Burnham. The main house sits 40 metres (130 ft) above the banks of the River Thames, and its grounds slope down to the river. There have been three houses on this site. The first was built in 1666 and burned down in 1795, while the second house was constructed around 1824 and was also destroyed by fire, in 1849. The present Grade I listed house was built in 1851 by the architect Charles Barry for the 2nd Duke of Sutherland.

Cliveden has been the home to a Prince of Wales, two dukes, an earl, and finally the Viscounts Astor. As the home of Nancy Astor, wife of the 2nd Viscount Astor, Cliveden was the meeting place during the 1920s and 1930s of the Cliveden Set, a group of political intellectuals. Later, during the early 1960s, when it was the home of the 3rd Viscount Astor, it became the setting for key events of the notorious Profumo affair. After the Astor family stopped living there, by the 1970s, it was leased to Stanford University, which used it as an overseas campus. It is now leased to a company that runs it as a luxury hotel.

The 375-acre (152 ha) gardens and woodlands are open to the public, together with parts of the house on certain days. Cliveden has been one of the National Trust's most popular pay-for-entry visitor attractions, and hosted 563,416 visitors in 2025.

== Etymology ==
Cliveden means "valley among cliffs" and refers to the dene (valley) which cuts through part of the estate, east of the house. Cliveden has been spelled differently over the centuries, some of the variations being Cliffden, Clifden, Cliefden, and Clyveden.^{:10}

== Present house ==
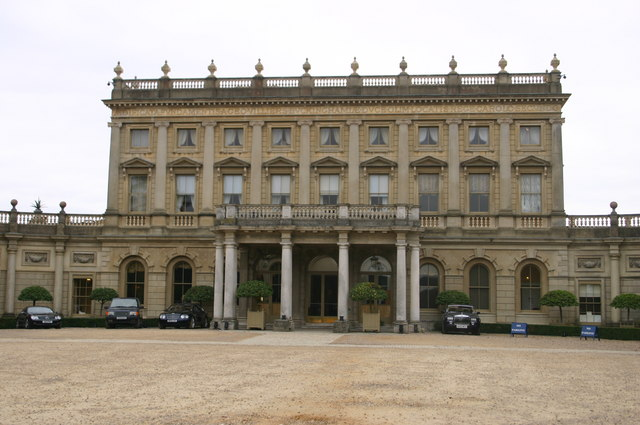
The north front.

Designed by Charles Barry in 1851 to replace a house previously destroyed by fire, the present house is a blend of the English Palladian style and the Roman Cinquecento.^{:29} The Victorian three-storey mansion sits on a 400-foot (120 m) long, 20-foot (6.1 m) high brick terrace or viewing platform (visible only from the south side) which dates from the mid-17th century. The exterior of the house is rendered in Roman cement, with terracotta additions such as balusters, capitals, keystones, and finials. The roof of the mansion is meant for walking on, and there is a circular view, above the tree-line, of parts of Buckinghamshire and Berkshire including Windsor Castle to the south.^{:206}

Below the balustraded roofline is a Latin inscription which continues around the four sides of the house and recalls its history; it was composed by the then prime minister William Ewart Gladstone. On the west front, it reads: POSITA INGENIO OPERA CONSILIO CAROLI BARRY ARCHIT A MDCCCLI, which translated reads: "The work accomplished by the brilliant plan of architect Charles Barry in 1851." Continuing clockwise, text on the other fronts translates as: "Constructed upon foundations laid long before by George Villiers Duke of Buckingham in Charles the Second's reign", "Completed in the year of Our Lord 1851 when Victoria had been Queen by God's grace for fourteen years" and "Restored by George Duke of Sutherland and Harriet his wife on the site where two houses had previously been burnt down". The main contractor for the work was Lucas Brothers.

In 1984–86, the exterior of the mansion was overhauled and a new lead roof was installed by the National Trust, while interior repairs were carried out by Cliveden Hotel. In 2013, further exterior work was carried out including the restoration of 300 sash windows and 20 timber doors.

=== Interior ===
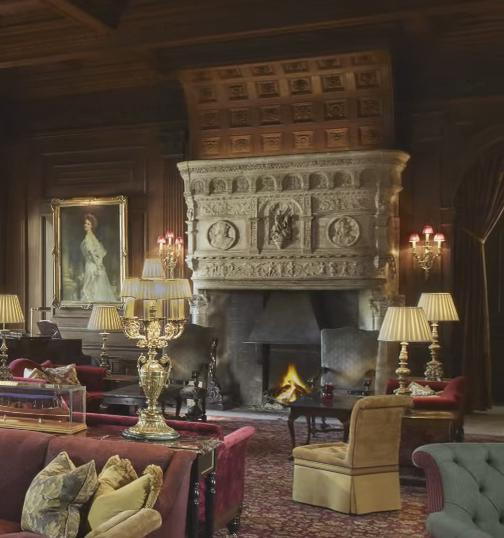
The Hall showing the fireplace and portrait of Nancy Astor.

The interior of the house today is very different from its original appearance in 1851–52. This is mainly due to the 1st Viscount Astor, who radically altered the interior layout and decoration c.1894–95. Whereas Barry's original interior for the Sutherlands had included a square entrance-hall, a morning room, and a separate stairwell, Lord Astor wanted a more impressive entrance to Cliveden, so he had all three rooms amalgamated to create the Great Hall.^{:134}

Lord Astor's aim was for the interior to resemble an Italian palazzo, thus complementing the exterior. The ceiling and walls were panelled in English oak, with Corinthian columns and swags of carved flowers for decoration, all by architect Frank Pearson. The staircase newel posts are ornamented with carved figures representing previous owners (e.g. Buckingham and Orkney) by W.S. Frith.

Lord Astor installed a large 16th-century fireplace that was purchased from the Frederick Spitzer sale (lot 1273) in June 1893. To the left of the fireplace is a portrait of Nancy, Lady Astor, by the American portraitist John Singer Sargent. The room was and still is furnished with 18th-century tapestries and suits of armour.

Originally, the floor was covered with Minton encaustic tiles (given to the Sutherlands by the factory), but Nancy Astor had them removed in 1906 and the present flagstones laid. Above the staircase is a painted ceiling by French artist Auguste Hervieu, which depicts the Sutherlands' children painted as the four seasons, and it is the only surviving element of Barry's 1851–52 interior.

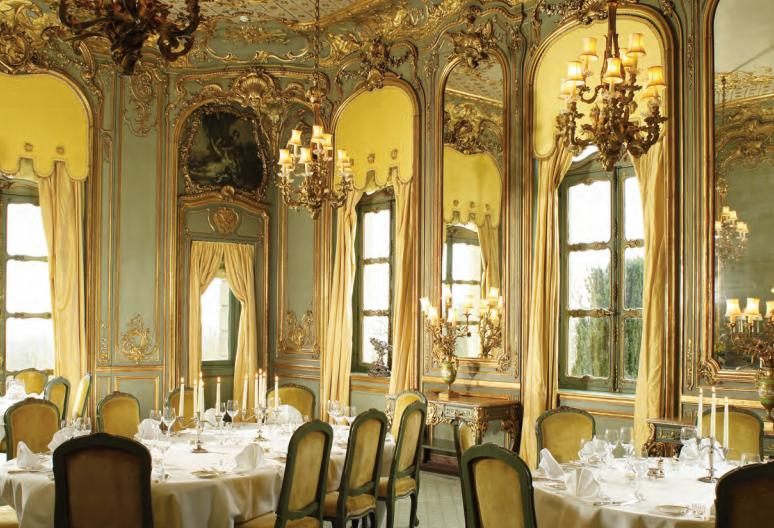
The French Dining Room.

The French Dining Room is so-called because the 18th-century Rococo panelling (or boiseries) came from Château d'Asnières near Paris, a château which was leased to Louis XV and his mistress Madame de Pompadour as a hunting lodge. The panelling was sold in 1897 by Jules Allard to the 1st Viscount Astor, who had it installed at Cliveden. The gilded panelling on a turquoise ground contains carvings of hares, pheasants, hunting dogs and rifles. The console tables and buffet were made in 1900 to match the room.

The second-largest room on the ground floor, after the Great Hall, was the original drawing room, which is used as the hotel's main dining room. Also on the ground floor is the library, panelled in cedar wood, which the Astors used to call the "cigar box".^{:181} Next door was Nancy Astor's boudoir, which is now used by the hotel as a meeting room.

Upstairs, there are a total of 10-bedroom suites divided equally over two floors. The East wing was and still is guest accommodation, whereas the West wing was domestic offices that were converted into more bedrooms in 1994.

=== Clock Tower ===
The nearby 100-foot (30 m) clock tower was added in 1861 and is the work of the architect Henry Clutton. As a functioning water tower, it still provides water for the house today. It is rendered in Roman cement like the rest of the house, and it features four clock faces framed by gilded surrounds and a half-open staircase on its north side. It was described by the architectural critic Nikolaus Pevsner as "the epitome of Victorian flamboyance and assertiveness."

The tower is topped with a modern reproduction of Augustin Dumont's 19th-century winged male figure Le Génie de la Liberté (the Spirit of Liberty). The original is atop the July Column in the Place de la Bastille, Paris. This replaces two earlier versions, the first having fallen from the tower during a storm in the 1950s. The new statue is made of bronze and was created using Dumont's original mould from the 1860s found in a museum in Semur-en-Auxois, France. It measures 2.2 m in height, is covered in two layers of 23.5 carat gold leaf and cost a total of £68,000. It is an allegorical sculpture which holds the torch of civilization in its right hand and the broken chain of slavery in its left. It was affixed to the tower in the spring of 2012.

== History ==
=== Duke of Buckingham and early history ===
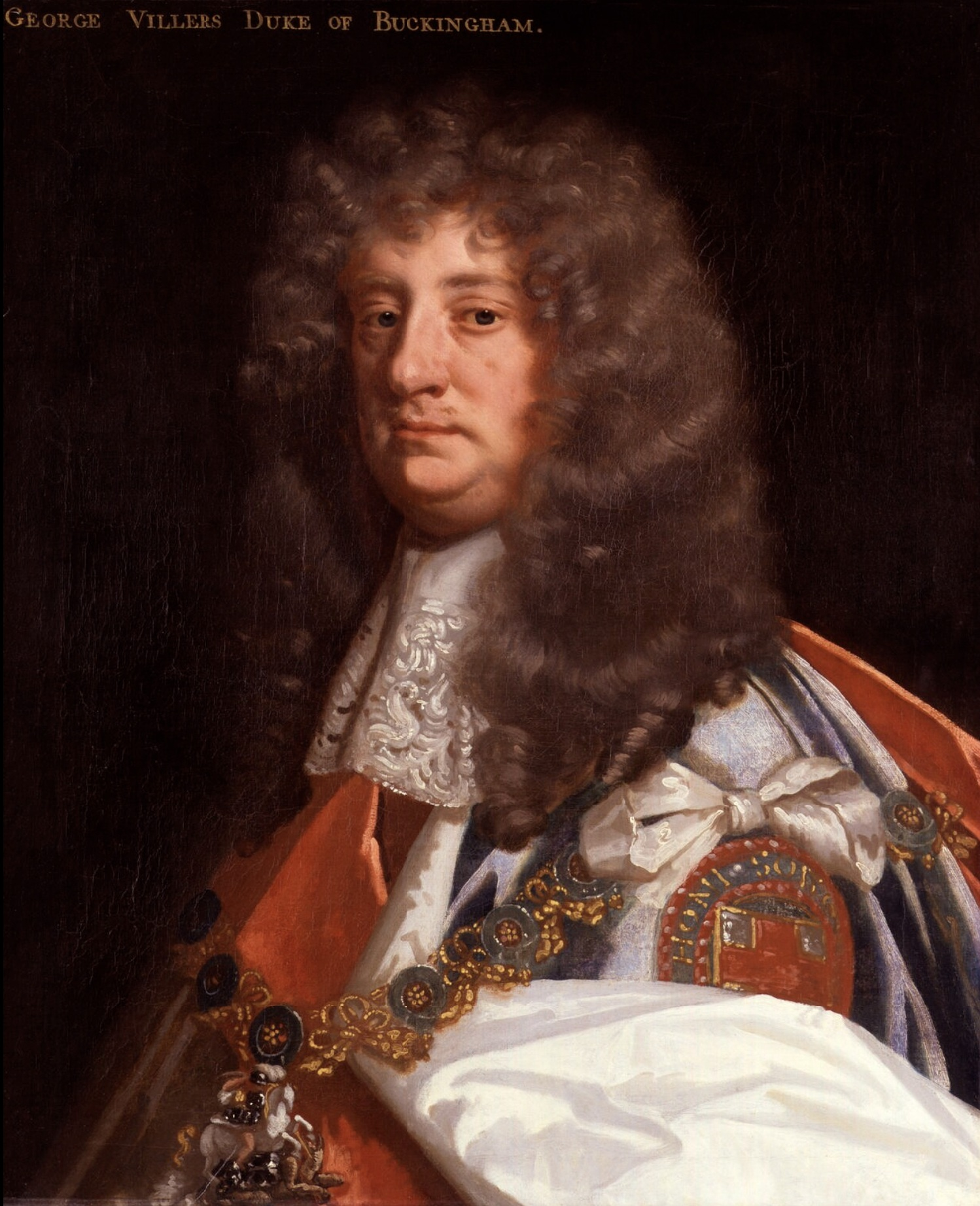
The Duke of Buckingham, whom Cliveden was built for

Cliveden stands on the site of a house built in 1666 designed by architect William Winde as the home of George Villiers, 2nd Duke of Buckingham. But before Buckingham's purchase the land was owned by the Mansfield family and before that to the de Clyveden family.^{:10}

The details are recorded in a document compiled by William Waldorf Astor in 1894 called The Historical Descent of Cliveden. Derived from several historical sources including George Lipscombe's History of the County of Buckingham, the Lysons brothers Magna Britannia, and James Joseph Sheahan's History of Buckinghamshire, it shows that in 1237 the land was owned by Geoffrey de Clyveden and by 1300 it had passed to his son, William, who owned fisheries and mills along the Cliveden Reach stretch of the Thames and at nearby Hedsor.

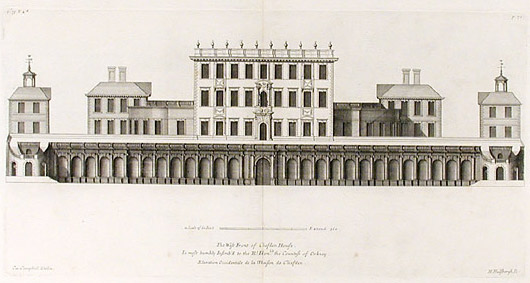
The 1666 house. Only the arcaded terrace remains today. From Colen Campbell's Vitruvius Britannicus, c.1717.

In 1569 a lodge existed on the site along with 50 acres (20 ha) of land and was owned by Sir Henry Manfield; it was later owned by his son, Sir Edward. In 1573, there were two lodges on 160 acres (65 ha) of treeless chalk escarpment above the Thames. It was on this impressively high but exposed site that Buckingham chose to build the first Cliveden house.^{:2}

Buckingham pulled down the earlier buildings and chose William Winde as his architect. Winde designed a four-storey house above an arcaded terrace. Today the terrace is the only feature of Buckingham's house to survive the 1795 fire. Although the Duke's intention was to use Cliveden as a "hunting box", it later housed Anna Talbot, Countess of Shrewsbury. In 1668 a duel between the Duke and his mistress's husband Lord Shrewsbury took place at Barn Elms near London and resulted in Shrewsbury dying of his wounds. A contemporary account of Buckingham's affair with Anna was written about by Samuel Pepys, in his diary of the period.

John Evelyn, another contemporary diarist, visited the Duke at Cliveden on 22 July 1679 and recorded the following impression in his Diary:

"I went to Clifden, that stupendous natural rock, wood, and prospect, of the Duke of Buckingham's, and buildings of extraordinary expense. The grots in the chalky rocks are pretty: it is a romantic object, and the place altogether answers the most poetical description that can be made of solitude, precipice, prospect, or whatever can contribute to a thing so very like their imaginations. The stand, somewhat like Frascati as to its front, and on the platform is a circular view to the utmost verge of the horizon, which, with the serpenting of the Thames, is admirable. The staircase is for its materials singular; the cloisters, descents, gardens, and avenue through the wood, august and stately; but the land all about wretchedly barren, and producing nothing but fern."

=== 18th century ===
==== 1st Earl of Orkney ====
After Buckingham died in 1687, the house remained empty until the estate was purchased in 1696 by George Hamilton, 1st Earl of Orkney, a soldier and colonial official.^{:2–3} The Earl employed the architect Thomas Archer to add two new "wings" to the house, connected by curved corridors. Although an almost identical arrangement exists today, these are later reconstructions, the originals having been destroyed in the fire of 1795. All that remains of Archer's work inside the house today is a staircase in the West wing.

Orkney's contributions to the gardens can still be seen today, most notably the Octagon Temple and the Blenheim Pavilion, both designed by the Venetian architect Giacomo Leoni.^{:15} The landscape designer Charles Bridgeman was also commissioned to devise woodland walks and carve a rustic turf amphitheatre out of the cliff-side.^{:12}

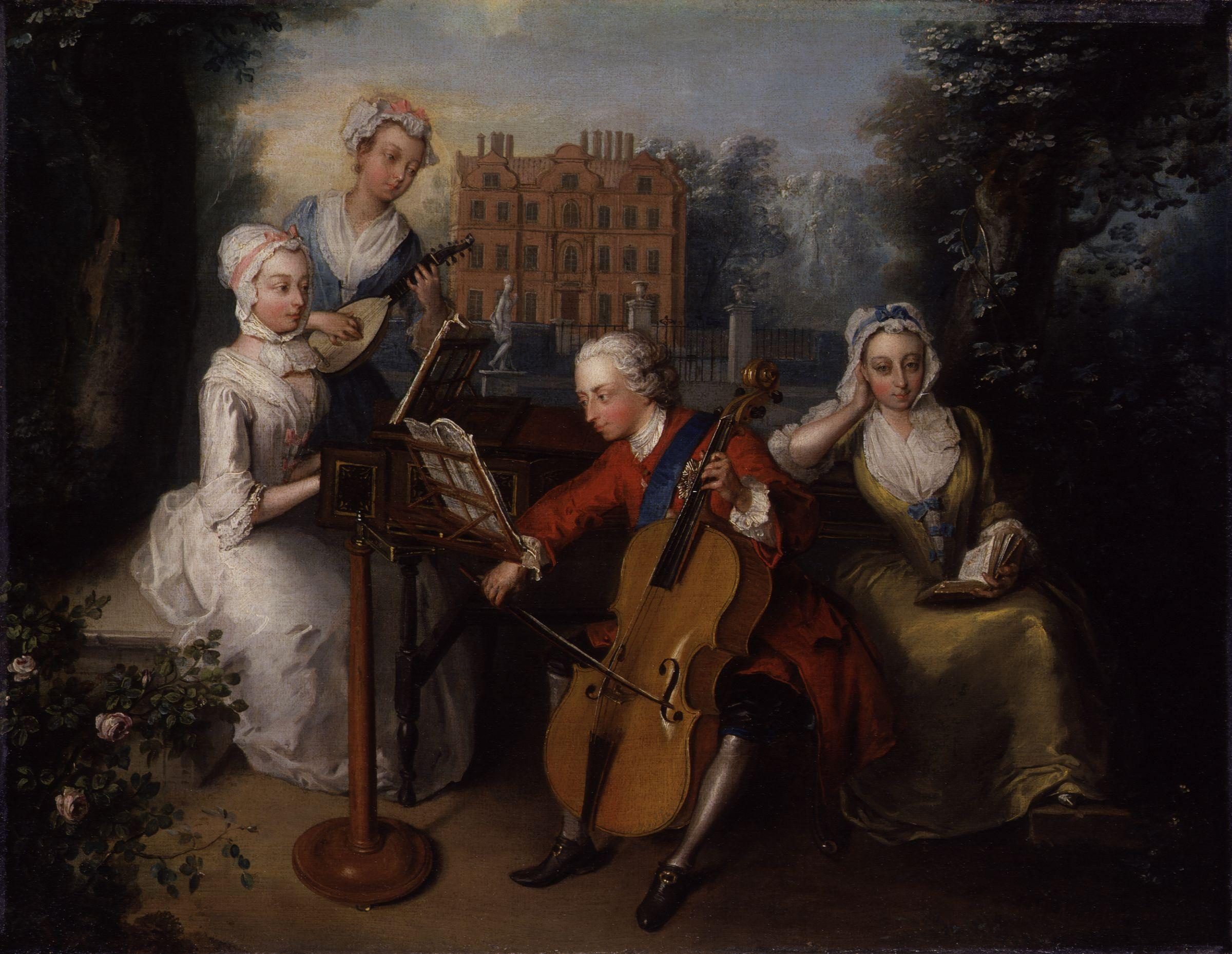
Frederick, Prince of Wales with his sisters, c. 1733, in The Music Party by Philippe Mercier

==== Countesses of Orkney ====
Orkney died in 1737, and Cliveden passed to his daughter Anne O'Brien, 2nd Countess of Orkney in her own right. She immediately leased it to Frederick, Prince of Wales, eldest son of George II and father of George III. After Frederick fell out with his father, Kew and Cliveden became his refuge from life at the royal court, becoming family homes for his wife Augusta and their children. During the Prince's tenure of the house, on 1 August 1740, Rule, Britannia! (an aria by the English composer Thomas Arne with lyrics by Scottish poet James Thomson) was first performed in public in the cliff-side amphitheatre at Cliveden. It was played as part of the masque Alfred to celebrate the third birthday of the Prince's daughter Augusta.

Cliveden was also the location for the final illness of the Prince: it was believed that while playing cricket in the grounds at Cliveden in 1751 the Prince received a blow to the chest from a batted ball and that this had caused an infection which proved fatal; however, an alternative interpretation shows he died from a cold, followed by a pulmonary embolism. After his death, Frederick's family retained Kew and their townhouse, Leicester House, but gave up their lease on Cliveden. Anne and her family moved back into the house, passing it to her daughter, Mary O'Brien, 3rd Countess of Orkney and granddaughter, Mary FitzMaurice, 4th Countess of Orkney, who also lived there. On the night of 20 May 1795, the house caught fire and burned down. The cause of the fire was thought to have been a servant knocking over a candle. The 4th Countess moved out after the fire but retained the site, only selling it in 1824.

=== 19th century ===
==== Sir George Warrender ====
After the fire of 1795 the house remained a ruin for the first quarter of the 19th century. In 1824, the estate was purchased by Sir George Warrender, 4th Baronet. To rebuild Cliveden, Warrender selected William Burn, a Scottish architect, and decided on a design for a two-storey mansion with entertaining on a grand scale in mind.^{:2}

==== 2nd Duke of Sutherland ====
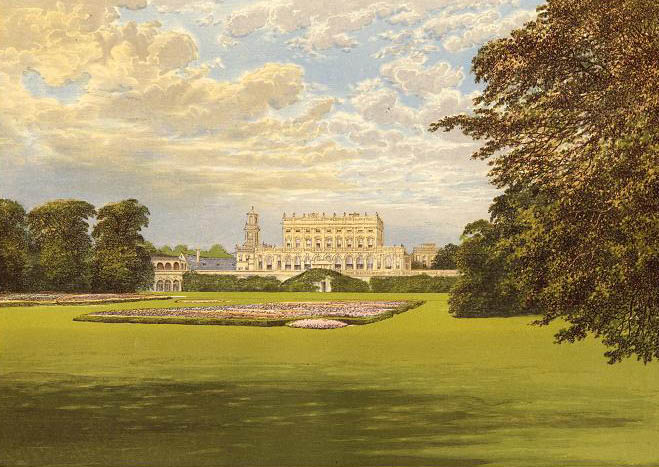
A 19th-century engraving of the 1851 house from the parterre.

Warrender died in 1849 and the house was sold to the Leveson-Gower family, headed by George Sutherland-Leveson-Gower, 2nd Duke of Sutherland. Sutherland had been in possession of the estate for only a few months when the house burned down for the second time in its history. The cause this time appears to have been negligence on the part of the decorators.

The Duke was prompt in commissioning the architect Charles Barry to rebuild Cliveden in the style of an Italianate villa.^{:3} Barry, whose most famous project is arguably the Houses of Parliament, Westminster, was inspired by the outline of the two earlier houses for his design. The third (and present) house on the site was completed in 1851–52, and its exterior appearance has little changed since then.

The 100-foot-tall (30 m) clock tower, which is actually a water tower (still working to this day) was added in 1861 by the architect Henry Clutton.^{:20-21} During this period other additions were made to the estate, which included half-timbered cottages, a dairy, and a boathouse. Also around this time another architect, George Devey, was commissioned to build half-timbered cottages on the estate along with a dairy and boathouse.^{:28–29}

After the Duke's death in 1861 his widow Harriet continued to live at the house for part of the year until her death in 1868, after which it was sold to her son-in-law Hugh Lupus, Earl Grosvenor, later 1st Duke of Westminster.

==== 1st Duke of Westminster ====
When one lives in Paradise, how hard it must be to ascend in heart and mind to Heaven.

— Lady Frederick Cavendish on Cliveden, June 1863.

Westminster was one of the wealthiest Englishmen of the period. During his ownership of the estate (1868–93), he contributed significant additions to the house and gardens, including the porte cochère on the north front of the mansion, a new stable block and the dovecote, all designed by Henry Clutton.

=== 20th and 21st century ===
==== Astor era ====
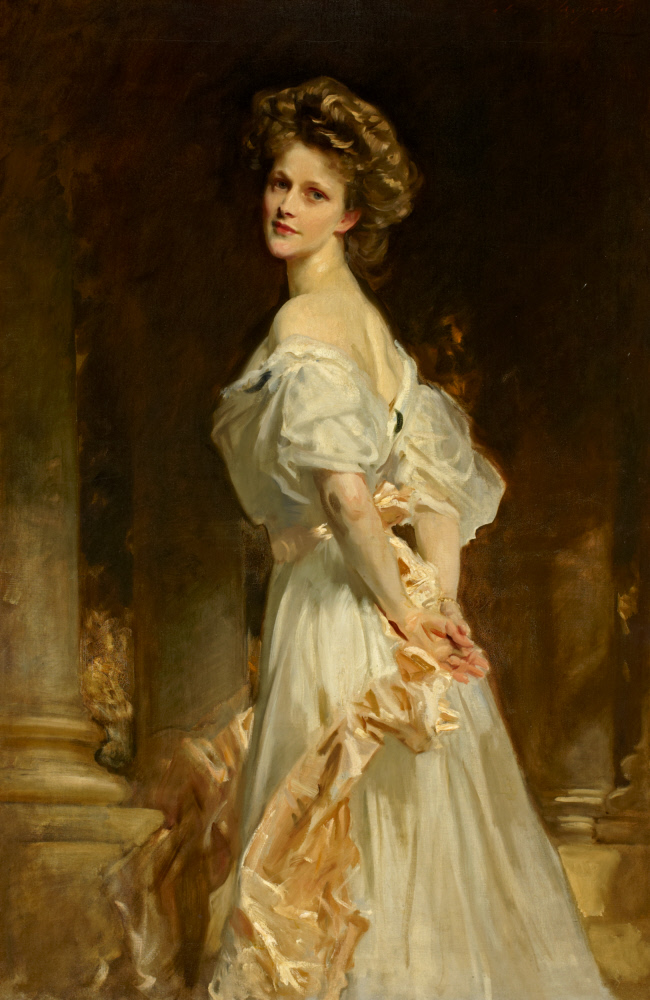
Nancy, Lady Astor by John Singer Sargent. The painting hangs at Cliveden.

In 1893 the estate was purchased by an American millionaire, William Waldorf Astor (later 1st Viscount Astor), who made sweeping alterations to the gardens and the interior of the house.^{:3} However, after the early death of his wife, he lived a reclusive life at Cliveden. He gave the house to his son Waldorf (later 2nd Viscount Astor) on the occasion of his marriage to Nancy Langhorne in 1906 and moved to Hever Castle.

The young Astors used Cliveden for entertaining on a lavish scale. The combination of the house, its setting, and leisure facilities offered on the estate – boating on the Thames, horse riding, tennis, swimming, croquet and fishing – made Cliveden a destination for film stars, politicians, world leaders, writers and artists. The heyday of entertaining at Cliveden was between the two World Wars when the Astors held regular weekend house parties. Guests at the time included: Charlie Chaplin, Winston Churchill, Joseph Kennedy, George Bernard Shaw, Mahatma Gandhi, Amy Johnson, Franklin D. Roosevelt, H. H. Asquith, T. E. Lawrence (Lawrence of Arabia), Arthur Balfour and the writers Henry James, Rudyard Kipling, and Edith Wharton.^{:213}

There is a ghastly unreality about it all ... I enjoy seeing it. But to own it, to live here, would be like living on the stage of the Scala theatre in Milan.

— Harold Nicolson after a visit to Cliveden in 1936.

During the inter-war period the entertainer Joyce Grenfell, who was Nancy Astor's niece, lived in a cottage on the estate. In the preface to her memoir, James Roose-Evans stated that during the Second World War, Grenfell ran two wards of the hospital and worked as an informal welfare officer. This work included completing errands for patients, writing letters, shopping, teaching needlework, and organising social events, and informal concerts.

==== Canadian Red Cross Memorial Hospital ====
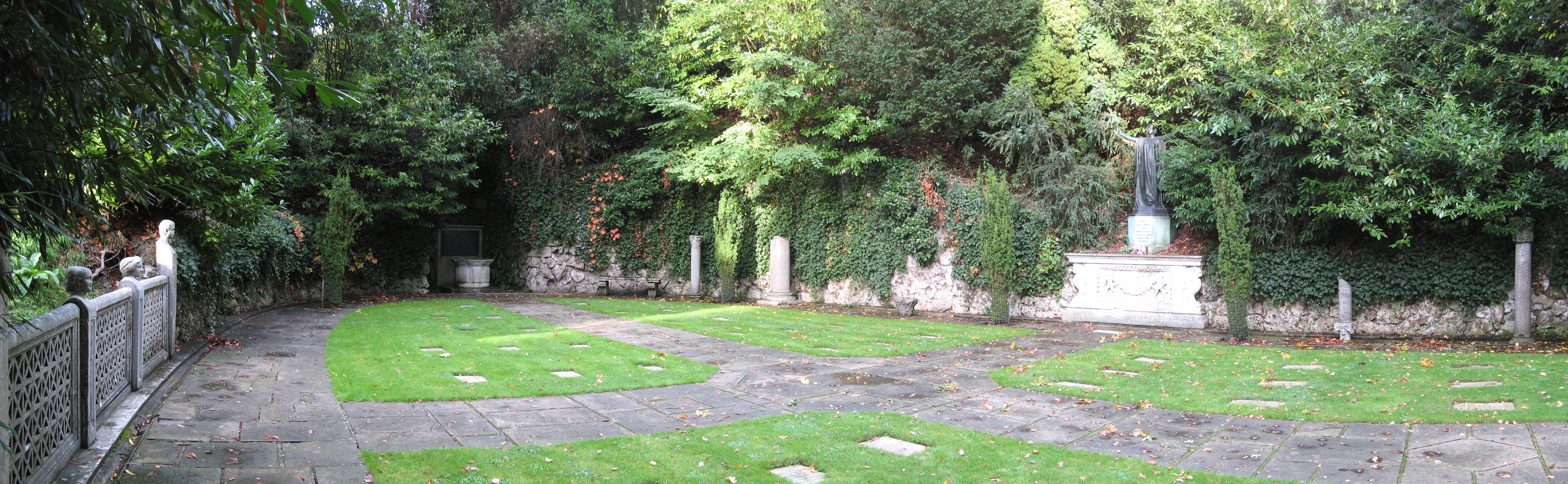
Cliveden War Cemetery in the Cliveden grounds

At the outbreak of World War I, Waldorf Astor offered the use of some of the grounds to the Canadian Red Cross for the building of a hospital—the HRH Duchess of Connaught Hospital—which was dismantled at the end of the hostilities. In September 1939 with the outbreak of World War II Waldorf Astor again offered the use of the land at a rent of one shilling per year to the Canadian Red Cross and the Canadian Red Cross Memorial Hospital was built to the designs of Robert Atkinson. After the war the hospital's main focus was as a nursing school, a maternity unit and a rheumatology unit.

The hospital closed and was abandoned in 1985. It lay derelict for two decades and was demolished in 2006 to make way for a housing development for people aged 55 and over.

Attached to the military hospital and within the grounds was established Cliveden War Cemetery. There are 42 Commonwealth war graves, 40 from World War I (mostly Canadians) and two from World War II, besides two American service war graves from the first war.

==== National Trust ownership ====
In 1942 the Astors gave Cliveden to the National Trust with the proviso that the family could continue to live in the house for as long as they wished. Should they cease to do so, they expressed the wish that the house be used "for promoting friendship and understanding between the peoples of the United States and Canada and the other dominions." With the gift of Cliveden, the National Trust also received from the Astor family one of their largest endowments: £250,000 in 1942, equivalent to £10,180,000 in 2025.

After the death of the 2nd Viscount in 1952, his son William (Bill) Astor, the 3rd Viscount Astor took over the house until his death in 1966. Following the death of Bill Astor, the National Trust took over the management of the estate.

Cliveden has become one of the National Trust's most popular pay-for-entry visitor attractions, and 563,416 people visited in 2025. National Trust visitors to Cliveden can visit the parkland, and there is occasional limited access to a select area of the house.^{:32}

==== Cliveden House Hotel ====
In 1984 Blakeney Hotels (later Cliveden Hotel Ltd) acquired the lease to the house. Led by chairman John Lewis and managing director John Tham they restored and refurbished the interior.^{:202}

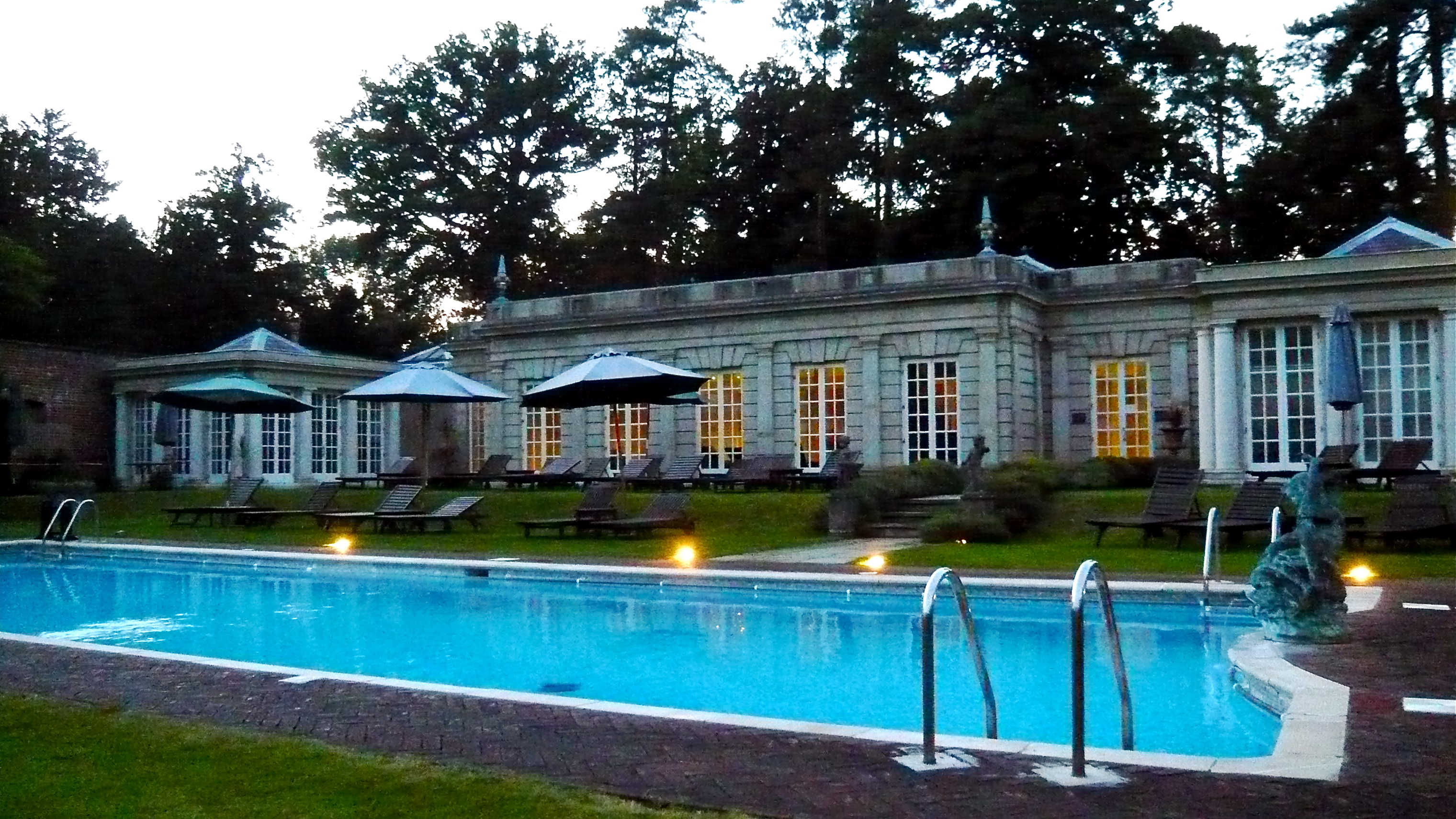
The Pavilion Spa. The outdoor pool was a key location in the Profumo affair.

In 1990 they added the indoor swimming pool and spa treatment rooms in the walled garden, complementing the existing outdoor pool. Also in 1990, a new 100-year lease was granted to run from 1984. In 1994 the conversion of the West wing from domestic offices to provide more bedrooms and two boardrooms (Churchill and Macmillan) was completed. There are 48 bedrooms and suites, all of which are named after previous owners and guests (e.g. Buckingham, Westminster). In addition to the Terrace Dining room, there are a further four private dining rooms. Three rooms are licensed for civil ceremonies and each year many couples are married at Cliveden. The hotel also leases Spring Cottage by the Thames, one of the key places in the Profumo affair, and offer it as self-contained accommodation.

The hotel was listed on the London Stock Exchange for a period of time in the 1990s (as Cliveden Plc).^{:202} This company was bought in 1998 by Destination Europe, a consortium including Microsoft CEO Bill Gates. In the early years of the 21st century the lease was acquired by von Essen Hotels. In 2007, Cliveden House Hotel claimed to offer the "world's most expensive sandwich" at £100. The von Essen Platinum Club Sandwich was confirmed by Guinness World Records in 2007 to be the most expensive sandwich commercially available. Cliveden House was the "jewel in the crown" of Von Essen Hotels when the company collapsed in 2011.

The lease to Cliveden Hotel was then purchased in February 2012 by the property developers Richard and Ian Livingstone, owners of London & Regional Properties, (also the new owners of the next-door 220-acre estate called Dropmore Park) who placed it under the management of Andrew Stembridge from Chewton Glen. In 2015 Natalie Livingstone, the wife of Ian Livingstone, published The Mistresses of Cliveden, a history of some of the female occupants of the house. In January 2015 the hotel closed for one month to carry out a refurbishment of the interior and for the National Trust to repair the roof.

The hotel's insignia is that of the Sutherland family and consists of a coronet with interlaced "S"s and acanthus leaves. Three-dimensional versions of this insignia can be found on panels and radiator grills in parts of the house. The hotel's motto is "Nothing ordinary ever happened here, nor could it."

In October 2021 the building was one of 142 sites across England to receive part of a £35-million injection into the government's Culture Recovery Fund.

== Gardens and grounds ==
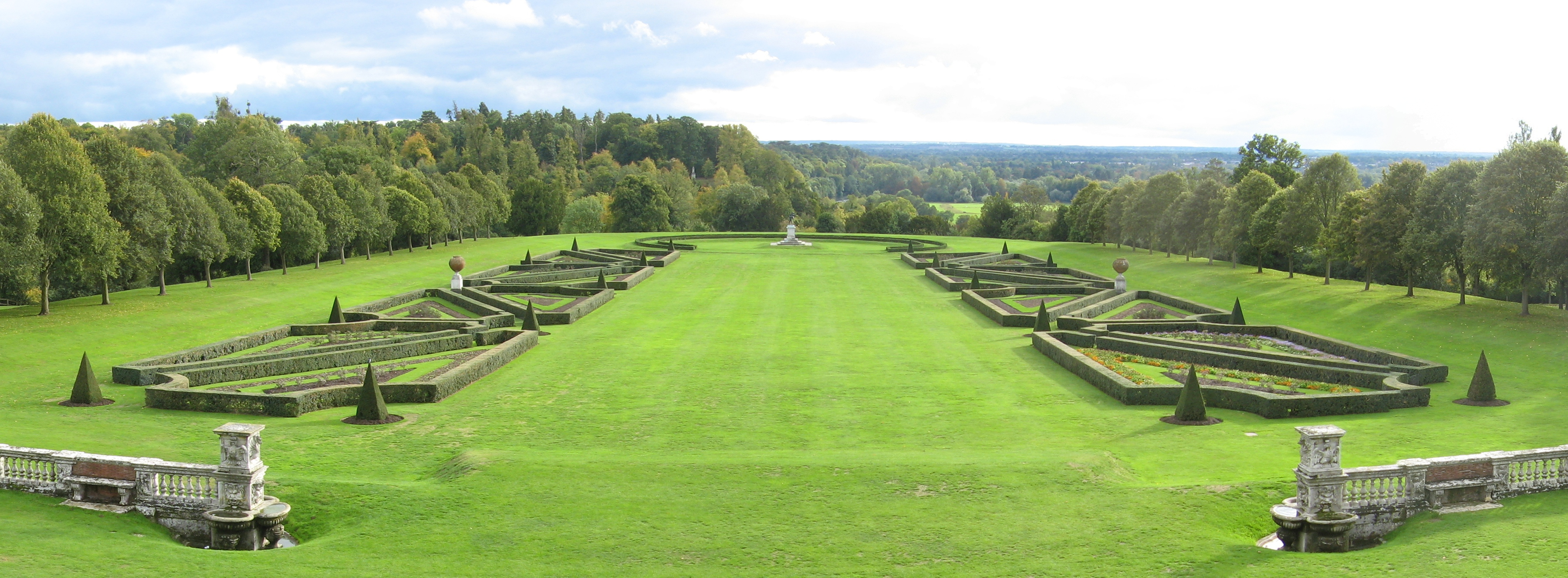
The parterre seen from the terrace, looking south, with the restored 19th-century style planting

The estate extends to 376 acres (1.52 km^{2}) of which about 180 acres (0.73 km^{2}) comprise the gardens, the rest being woodland and paddocks. The gardens are listed as Grade I on the Register of Historic Parks and Gardens.

=== Parterre ===
The formal parterre to the south of the house is one of the largest in Europe at 4 acres (1.6 ha). and is best viewed from the 20-foot (6.1m) high terrace on the south side of the mansion. This part of the garden has received the most attention over the centuries. The first arranging of the large plateau to the south of the house took place c.1723 during George Hamilton, Earl of Orkney's ownership. Although he had previously commissioned plans for elaborate parterre schemes from Claude Desgots, the nephew of André Le Nôtre (both designers had previously worked at Versailles), Orkney eventually chose a much simpler plan involving an open expanse of lawn surrounded by raised gravel walks and double rows of elm trees. At the far end there was (and still is) a sunken feature in the turf where Orkney's horses were exercised in a form of open-air manège.

Orkney referred to the garden as his "Quaker parterre" because of its simplicity. The parterre endured in this form until the mid-19th-century when the estate was owned by the Duke of Sutherland and by which time the garden had been neglected. It was described by the Duke's son Lord Ronald Gower as "a prairie...a huge field of grass and wild flowers." The Duke commissioned both Charles Barry (who had rebuilt the mansion after the second fire) and John Fleming (the head gardener) to produce designs for a complex parterre of flower beds. Fleming's design, which featured two sets of eight interlocking wedge-shaped beds, was chosen and is the template for what can be seen today. The beds were planted with a seasonal mix of bulbs, annuals, and shrubs such as gladioli, hollyhocks, tulips, pansies, and azaleas. Fleming pioneered this style of planting at Cliveden, which was later to be named "carpet-bedding."

The Cliveden scheme in the 19th century is well documented in Fleming's handbook Winter and Spring Flower Gardening (1864). The Trust planted the present clipped yew pyramids at the corners of the beds in 1976. At this time (and for the next three decades) the beds contained a massed-planting effect of silver-evergreen Senecio "Sunshine" and Santolina. However, in 2010 the Trust decided to recreate Fleming's original 19th-century planting scheme.

=== Themed gardens ===
The Italian-style Long Garden consists of topiary in the form of corkscrew-spirals, peacocks, and seasonal planting within box hedges; it was created by garden designer Norah Lindsay in c.1900. The Japanese-style Water Garden was designed in c.1893 and is believed to be the first such East Asian inspired garden in the country. It features a pagoda, on an island, bought from the Bagatelle estate in Paris. The planting there is mostly spring-flowering: cherry trees, bush wisterias, and giant gunneras. Both gardens were commissioned by the 1st Lord Astor.^{:25}

The circular Rose Garden, designed by Sir Geoffrey Jellicoe for the Astor family in the early 1960s subsequently suffered from rose disease and was replanted as a "secret" garden of herbaceous plants in the 2000s, but in 2014 the roses were reinstated. The planting in the herbaceous borders in the forecourt was designed in the 1970s by the National Trust advisor Graham Stuart Thomas.^{:11} The west-facing border features 'fiery'-coloured flowers (red, yellow, orange) and the east-facing border is planted with more subdued colours.

In 2011 the Trust began an ambitious project to restore the 19th-century Round Garden near the eastern edge of the estate. Originally this is where fruit was grown for the house, but since the 1950s it had become overgrown. The circular garden has a diameter of 250 ft and restoration will include reinstating the paths and wrought iron arches as well as original fruit varieties where possible.

=== Woodland ===
There is a lime tree avenue on either side of the main drive to the house. Cliveden holds part of the National Plant Collection of Catalpa. In 1897 the 1st Lord Astor imported a section of a Californian redwood and had it installed in the woods. At 16 ft 6 in (5.03 m) across it is the largest section of a Sequoia gigantea in Britain.

The woodlands were first laid out by Lord Orkney in the 18th century.^{:26–27} They were later much restocked by Bill Astor, however many of the trees fell in storms in the late twentieth century.^{:27}

=== Maze ===
The original Cliveden maze, commissioned by Lord Astor in 1894, has undergone major restoration after having lain overgrown and inaccessible since the 1950s. It was replanted with 1,100 six-foot-tall yew trees covering an area of one-third of an acre (0.13 hectares) and opened to the public in 2011.

=== Garden buildings: pavilions and follies ===
The earliest known garden buildings at Cliveden were both designed by Giacomo Leoni for Lord Orkney; the Blenheim Pavilion (c.1727) was built to commemorate Orkney's victory as a general at the Battle of Blenheim.^{:10}

The pagoda in the water garden was made for the Paris Exposition Universelle (1867) and was purchased by the 1st Viscount Astor from the Bagatelle estate in Paris in 1900.

In the woods, there is a small flint folly thought to date from the late-18th to early-19th century.

=== Octagon Temple (Astor family chapel) ===
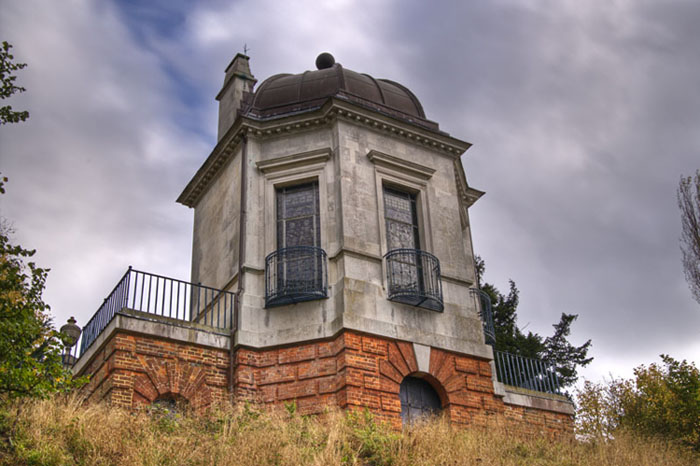
Giacomo Leoni's 1735 "Octagon Temple"

The Octagon Temple, situated 200 ft above the Thames, was originally designed by Giacomo Leoni in 1735 as a gazebo and grotto but was later converted by the 1st Viscount Astor to become the Astor family chapel.^{:15}

In addition to its function as Astor family chapel, the Octagon Temple was adapted to serve as the family mausoleum in 1893. Today, three generations of Astors are buried here. The mausoleum contains the ashes of the 1st Viscount Astor, his son the 2nd Viscount, and of the latter's wife, Nancy Astor. The ashes of the 3rd Viscount and of Robert Gould Shaw III (Nancy Astor's son by her first marriage) are also buried here.

The mausoleum's interior and dome are decorated with colourful mosaics by Clayton and Bell representing religious scenes.

=== Sculpture collection ===
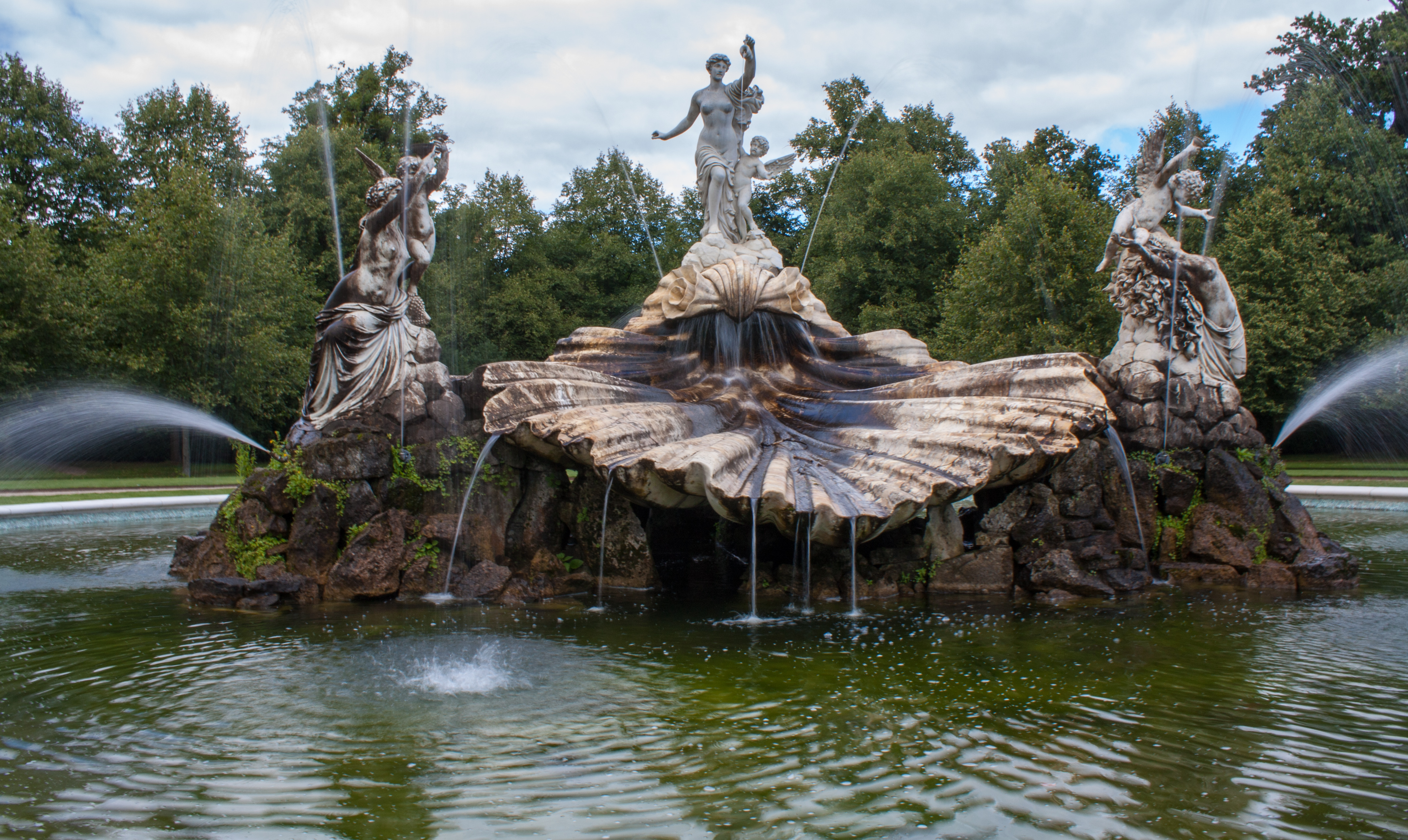
Thomas Waldo Story's Fountain of Love inscribed 'Waldo Story Roma 1897'

One of the features of the gardens is the large collection of sculptures, most of them acquired by the 1st Lord Astor from 1893 to 1906. The shell fountain, known as the Fountain of Love, greets visitors at the end of the lime tree avenue up to the house. It was sculpted by Thomas Waldo Story, (American, 1855–1915) in Rome in 1897 and was commissioned by Lord Astor for this site.^{:7} It features a large Carrara marble shell supporting three life-size female figures attended by cupid. The "Tortoise" fountain near the parterre was also made by Story at around the same time.^{:19}

In the forecourt, there is a collection of eight marble Roman sarcophagi, some of which date from c. 100 AD and were bought by Lord Astor from Rome.^{:20–21}

The Queen Anne Vase at the end of the Long Walk is said to have been given to Lord Orkney by Queen Anne in the eighteenth century.^{:7} It consists of a tall urn on a plinth decorated with the Greek key pattern.

At the far end of the parterre is a twentieth-century copy of a bronze group entitled The Rape of Proserpina (Italian, c.1565), bought by William Waldorf Astor from Italy. The original is now housed in the Victoria and Albert Museum.

The well-heads and oil jars found throughout the gardens came from Venice and Rome respectively.

Sitting on modern plinths in the Long Garden are two ancient Egyptian baboon sculptures, thought to be 2,000–2,500 years old, that were purchased by William Waldorf Astor in Rome in 1898. It is believed that these sculptures represent Thoth, the Egyptian god of writing and wisdom.

=== Borghese Balustrade ===
The largest sculpture on the grounds, technically in two parts, is the 17th-century Borghese Balustrade on the parterre. Purchased by Lord Astor in the late 19th century from the Villa Borghese gardens in Rome, it is crafted from Travertine stone and brick tiles by Giuseppe Di Giacomo and Paolo Massini in c.1618–19. It features seats and balustrading with fountain basins and carved eagles.^{:18–19}

=== "Cliveden Snail" ===
In 2004, a colony of small Mediterranean land snails of the species Papillifera bidens was discovered living on the Borghese Balustrade. Presumably, this species, new to the English fauna, was accidentally imported along with the balustrade in the late 19th century and managed to survive the intervening winters to the present day.

=== Spring Cottage ===
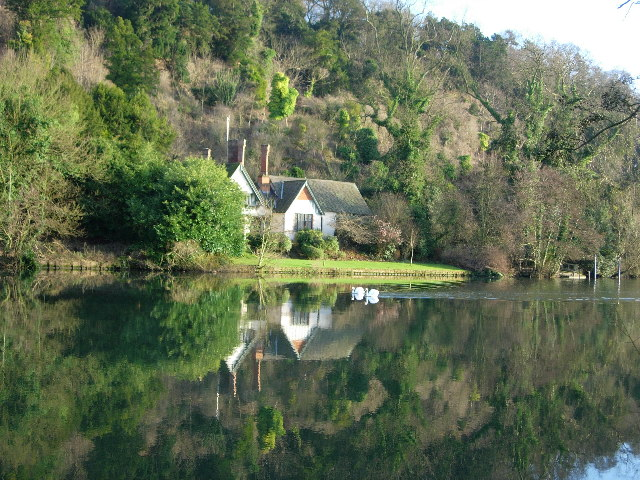
The west front of Spring Cottage across the River Thames with the Cliveden beechwoods behind.

This is the largest and most complex of the four timber-framed cottages designed or altered by the architect George Devey along the banks of the River Thames on the Cliveden estate. The first structure on the site was a Gothic-style summerhouse with an octagonal vaulted plaster ceiling designed in 1813 by architect Peter Nicholson for Mary FitzMaurice, 4th Countess of Orkney. She was living in one wing of the burnt down mansion at the time of the commission. It was used as a tea house and spa for the many visitors attracted to the nearby mineral springs, which flowed from the chalk cliff above and ran down into the Thames.

Nicholson published his designs for the house in his Architectural Dictionary of 1813 in the form of a cross-section of the interior and ceiling projection. In auction particulars dated 1821, which list all structures on the estate, the building is described as a Banqueting house "at the much admired spring", while several decades later it was described as an "ornamental fishing villa."

In 1857, the Duke of Sutherland, who had owned Cliveden for eight years, commissioned George Devey to enlarge the existing building into a two-storey cottage. The subsequent alterations were in the vernacular style with brick and stucco walls, fish-scale pattern roof slates, a Gothick-style loggia and a turret above an exterior staircase leading to a balcony. Throughout the remainder of the 19th century the main purpose of the cottage was as a place of leisure, and it was frequently used by the Duke's wife Harriet to entertain guests, most notably her friend Queen Victoria.

In 1957, the cottage came to the attention of London osteopath Stephen Ward, who had been hired to treat Bill Astor. He leased the cottage from the Astors for a minimal rent for use as a weekend retreat. Among the guests invited to stay, there were Christine Keeler and Mandy Rice-Davies.^{:184} A chance meeting in 1961 between Keeler and cabinet minister John Profumo (a guest of the Astors) at the Cliveden swimming pool led to the Profumo affair which so damaged the Macmillan government.^{:185}

Spring Cottage was awarded Grade II listed status in 1986, and in 1997 the hotel company which leased Cliveden House from the National Trust also acquired the lease to the cottage. A reported £750,000 was spent restoring and refurbishing the dilapidated building before it reopened in 1998 as a self-contained luxury holiday let.

=== Cliveden Reach ===
Cliveden Reach, between Cookham Lock and Boulter's Lock, is one of the most scenic stretches of the Thames. A section of the original Thames towpath extends from the boathouse, north to Cookham Lock. Cliveden House may be accessed by watercraft from the mooring on Cliveden Reach half a mile downstream from Cliveden boathouse. A series of eyots in the reach are owned by the National Trust, and allow for short periods of mooring for passing boats. Cliveden Reach is a popular spot for canoeing, kayaking, and angling. The National Trust offers self-hire boats and guided river cruises.

== In popular culture ==
=== Art ===
Cliveden has been depicted in paintings, for example: Cliveden, (c.1750–80) by William Tomkins, and A Fallen Beech with a Prospect of Cliveden, (1988) by Carl Laubin.

=== Film ===
The house has been used for filming on multiple occasions, including: A Very British Country House (2018); Hampstead (2017); Paul Hollywood City Bakes (2016); Mr Selfridge (2016); Cinderella (2015); A Little Chaos (2014); Endless Night (2013); Sherlock Holmes (2009); Made of Honour (2008); Cards on the Table (2005); Mrs. Henderson Presents (2005); Thunderbirds (2004); Antiques Roadshow (2000); Carrington (1995); Chaplin (1992); Dead Man's Folly (1986); Operation Daybreak (1975); Don't Lose Your Head (1966); Help! (1965); and Yaadein (2001).

=== Literature ===
Cliveden has been referenced in literature including: Three Men in a Boat (1889); Boogie Up the River (1989); Alexander Pope's Moral Essays; Daniel Defoe's A Tour Through England and Wales (1726) and Gore Vidal's novel The City and the Pillar (1948).

Both the house and the river have been suggested as the inspiration for Kenneth Grahame's children's novel The Wind in the Willows.

== Gallery ==
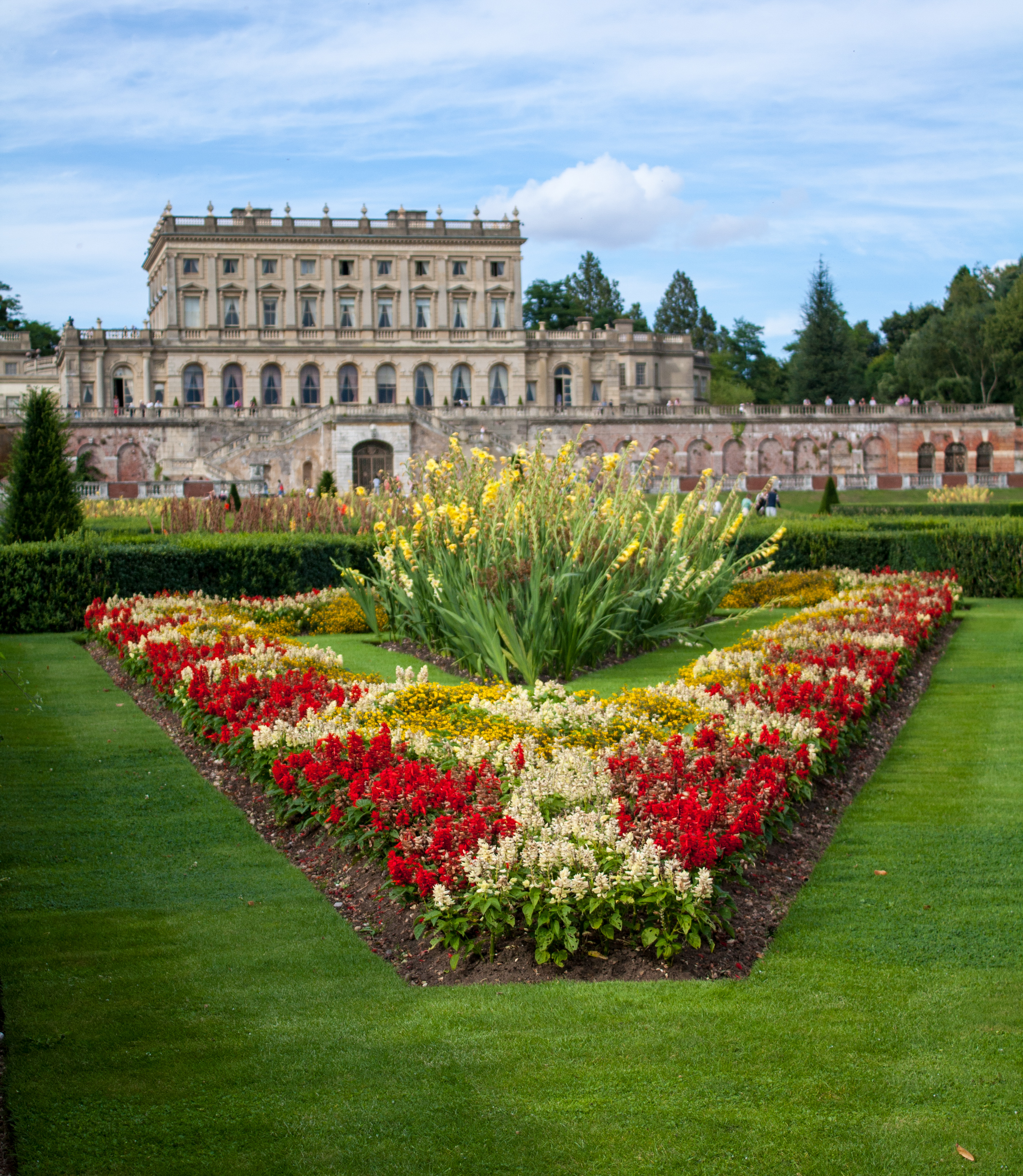
The house from the Parterre showing the restored 19th-century planting scheme

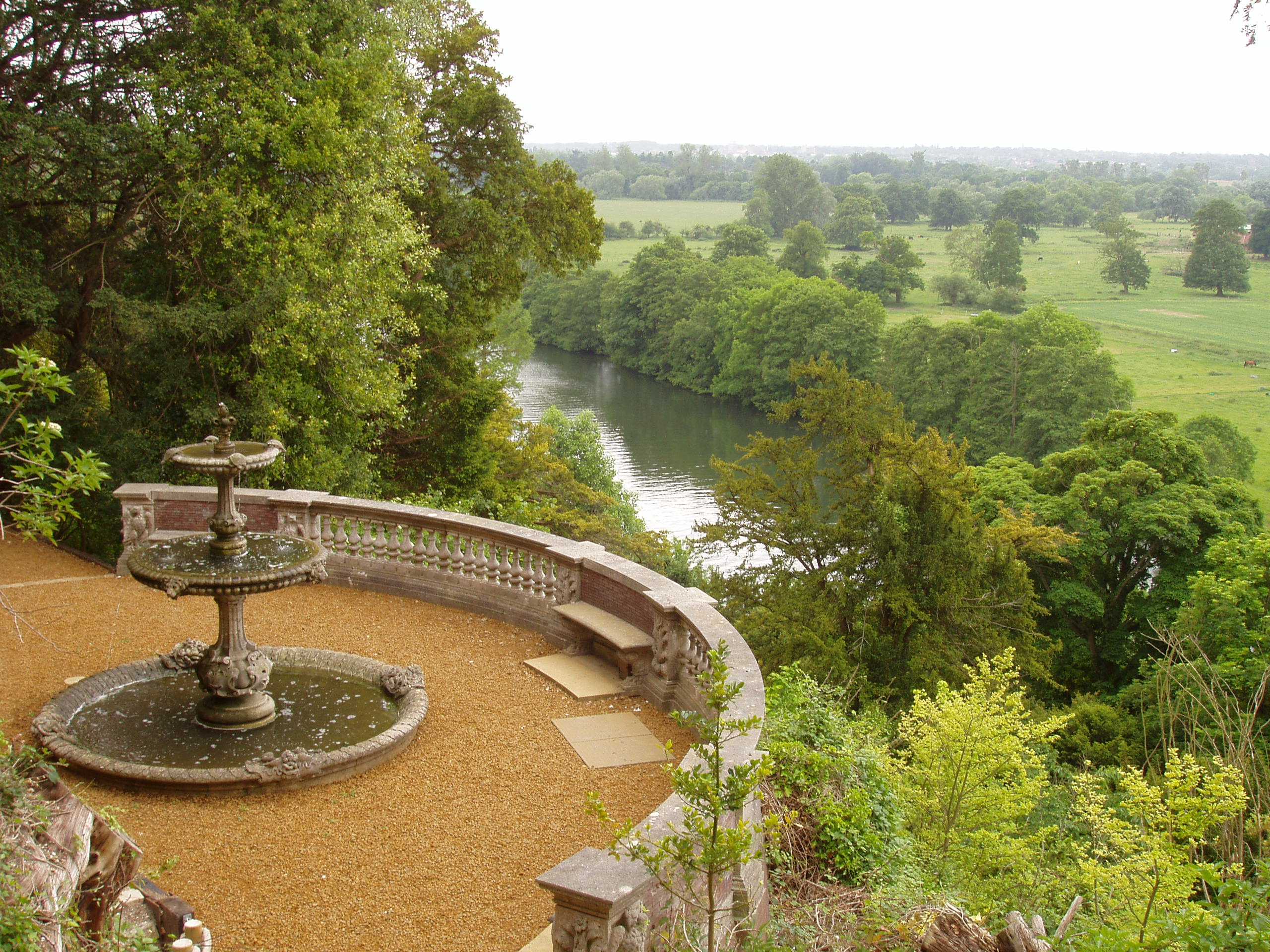
The Tortoise Fountain and view over the River Thames

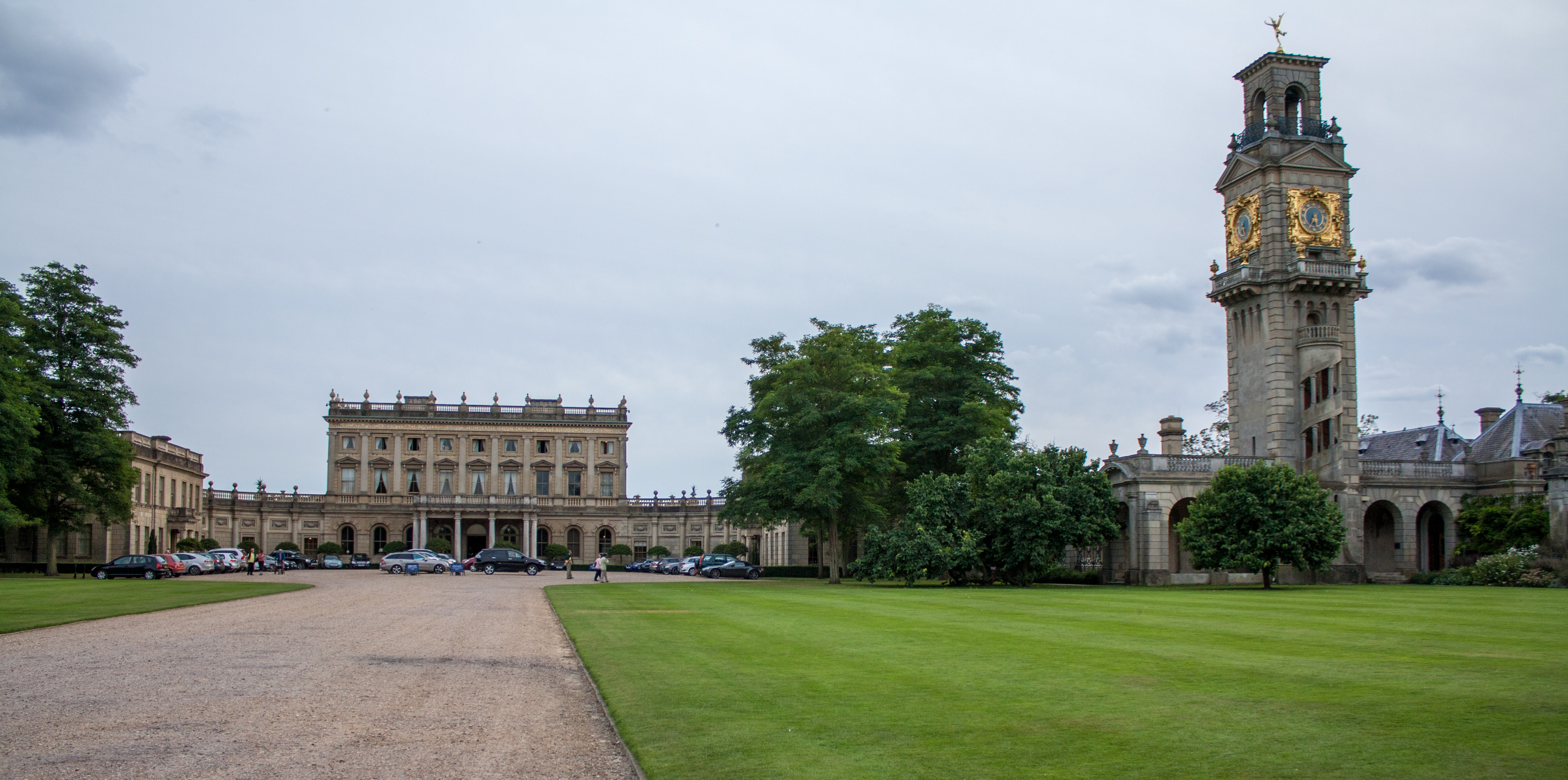
The North front with Clock tower

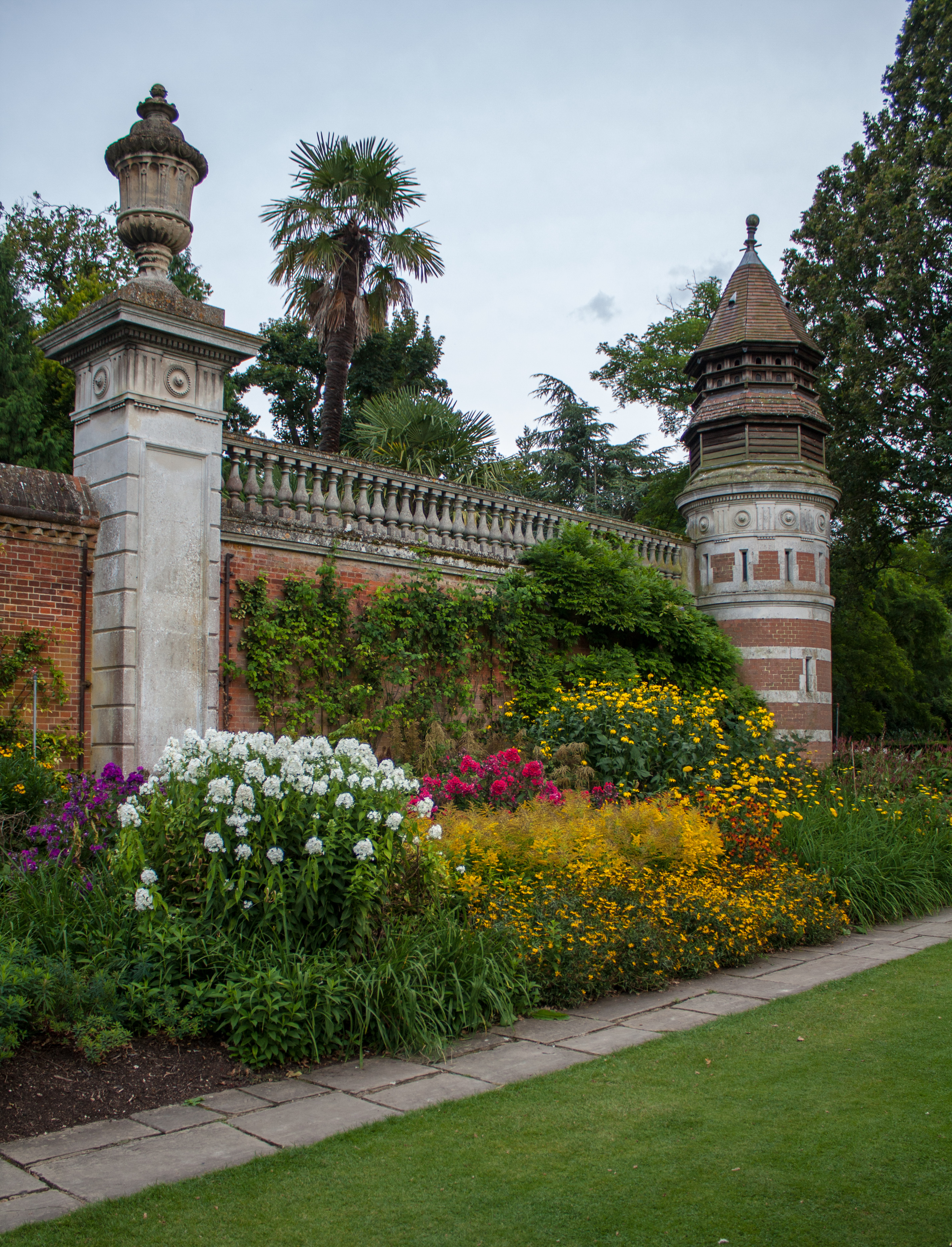
The dovecote behind the west-facing herbaceous border

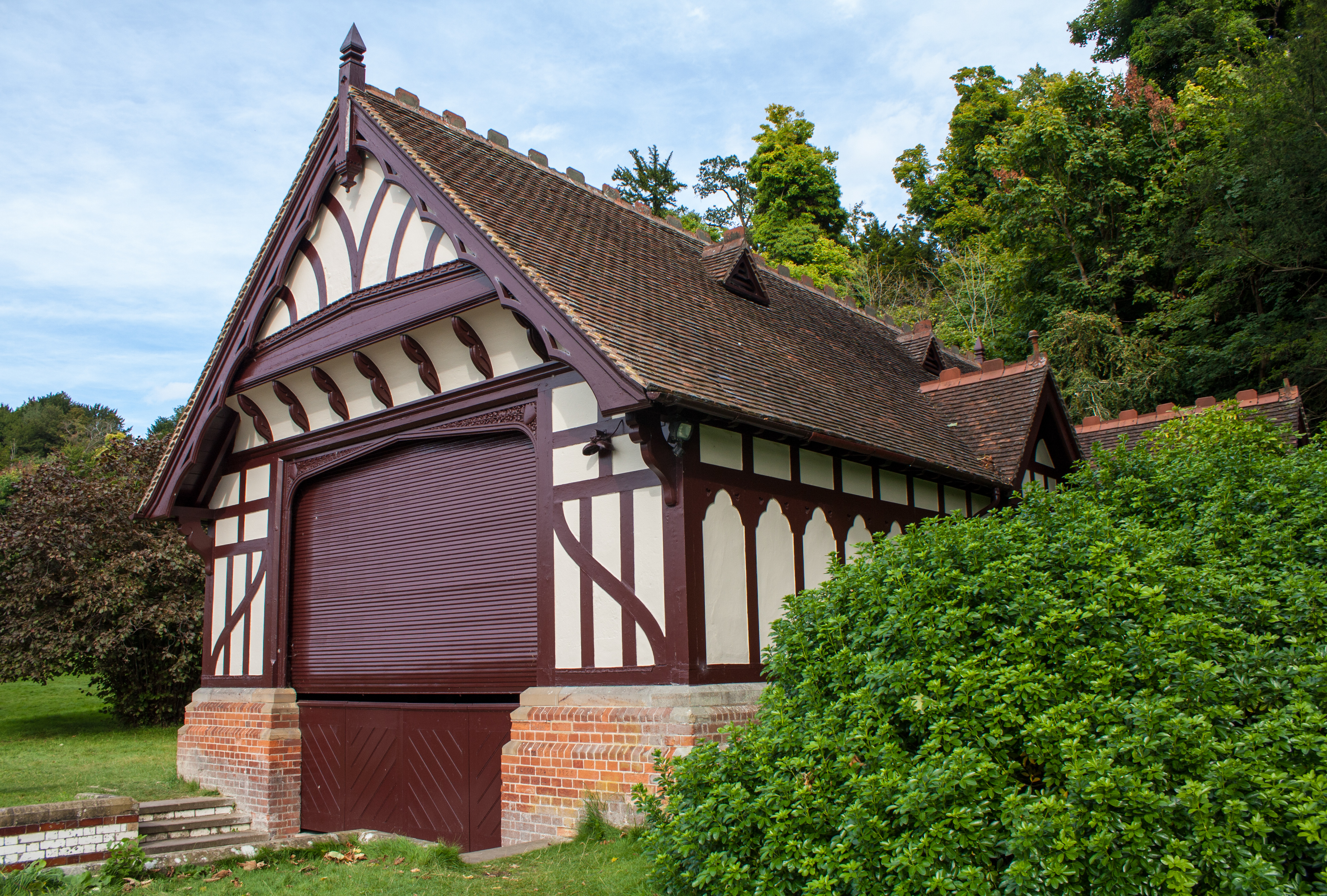
The 19th-century boathouse designed by George Devey

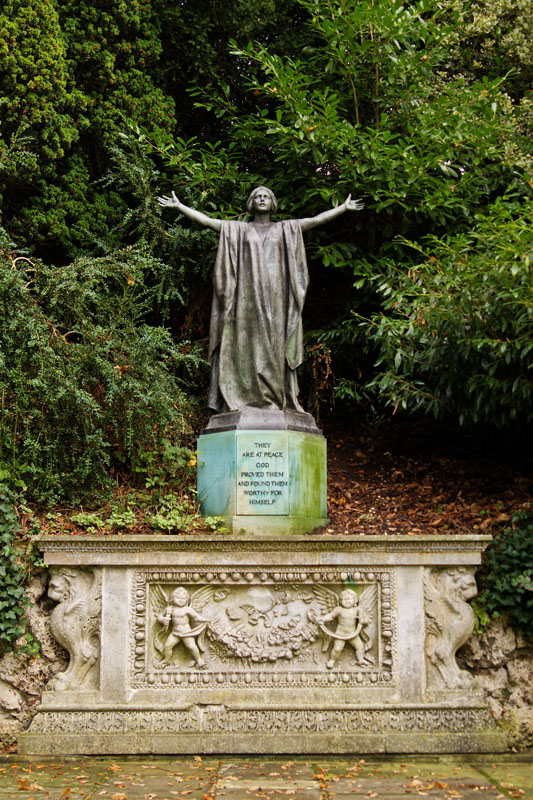
Sir Bertram MacKennal's figure representing Canada in the War Memorial Garden.

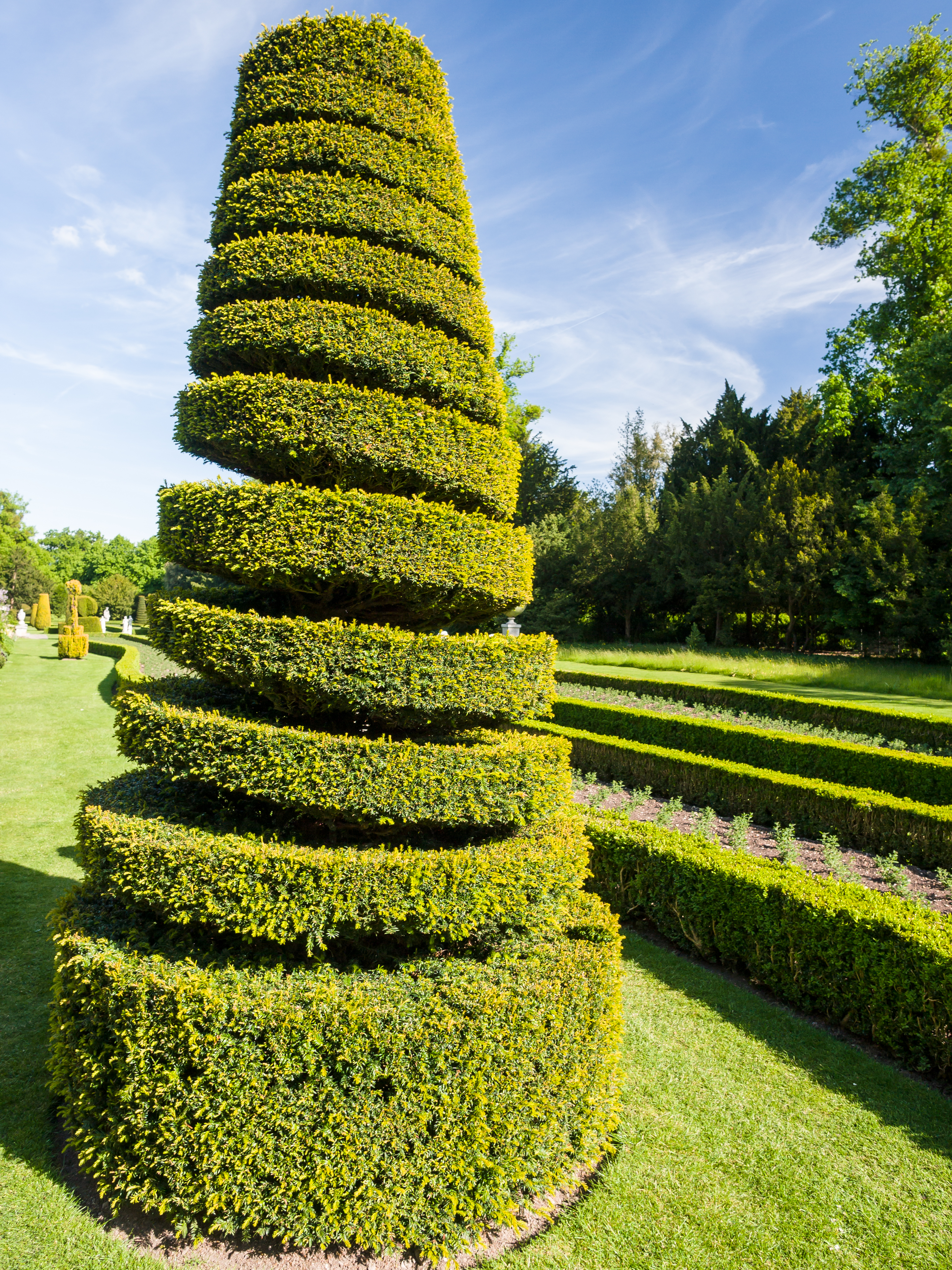
Topiary spiral in the Long Garden.

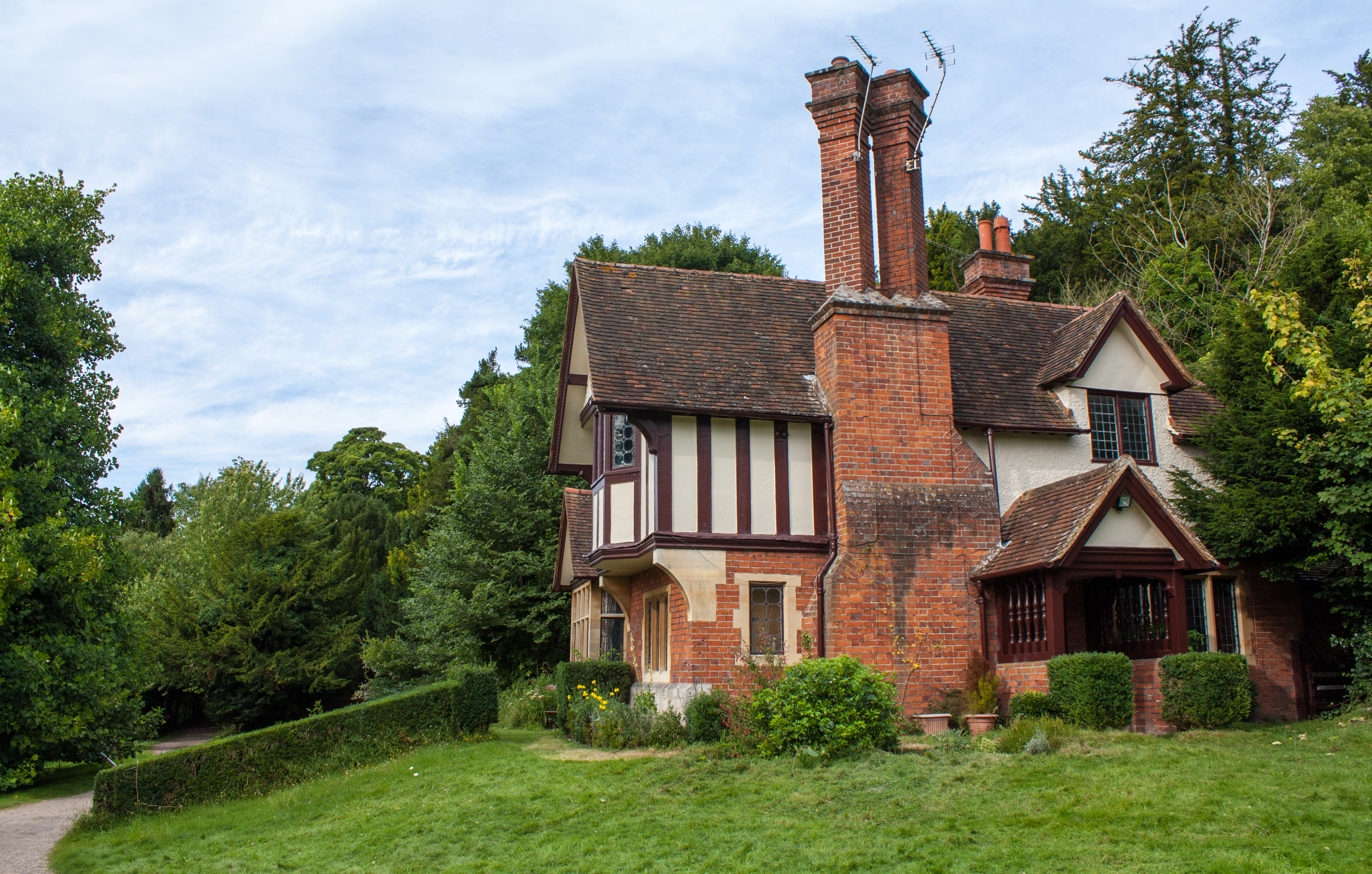
A 19th-century Thames-side cottage designed by George Devey

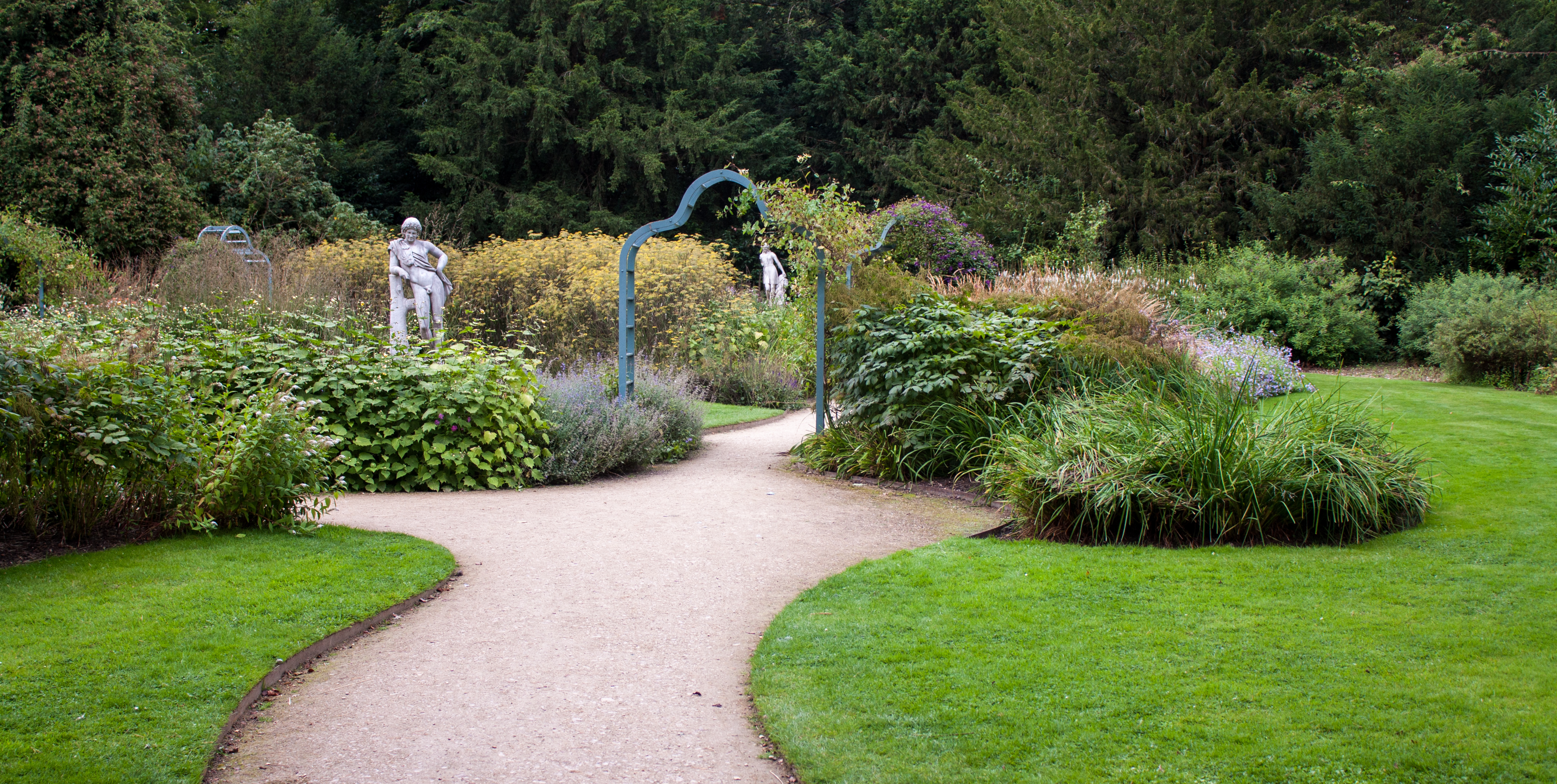
The circular Rose Garden with temporary herbaceous planting.

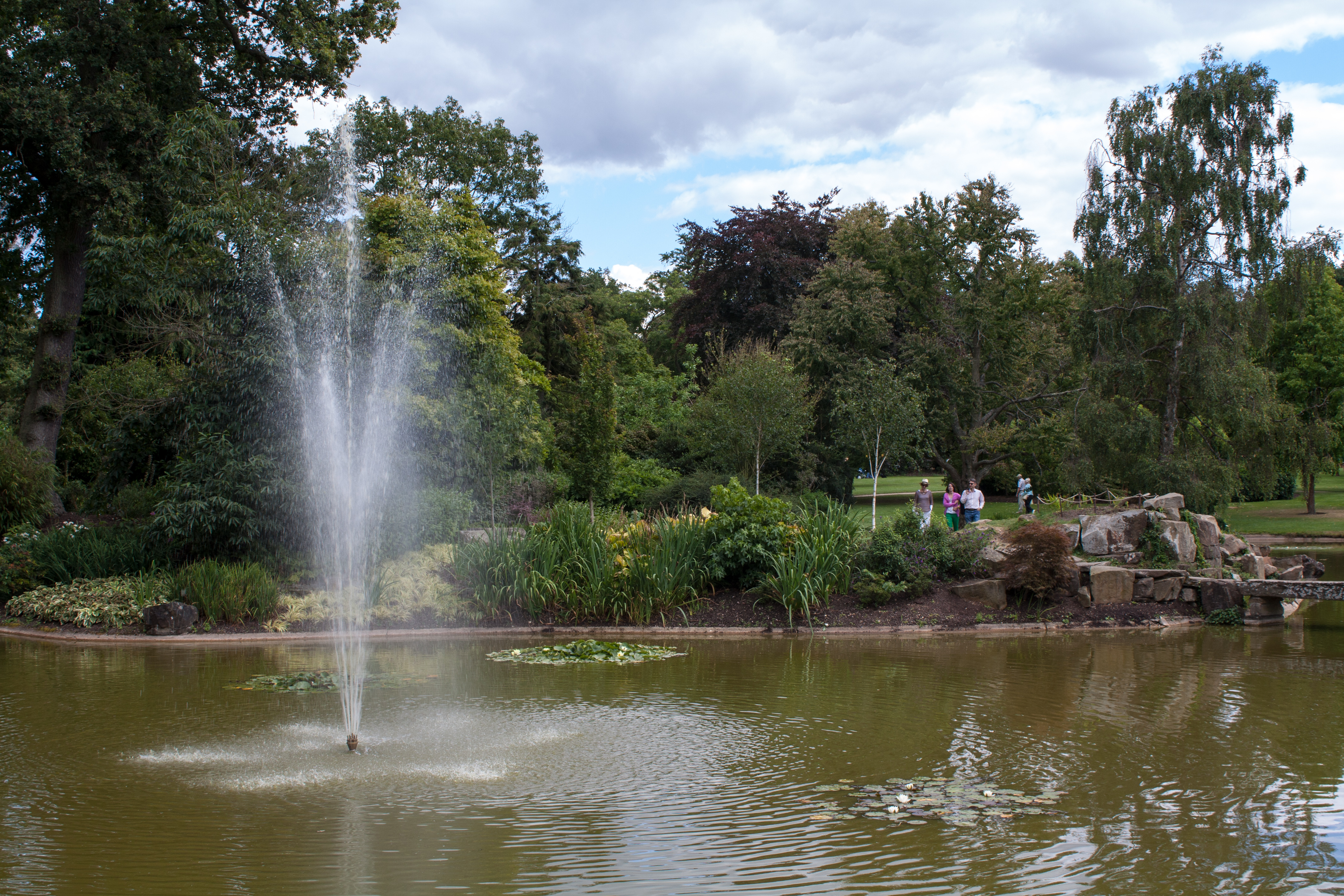
The fountain in the Water garden

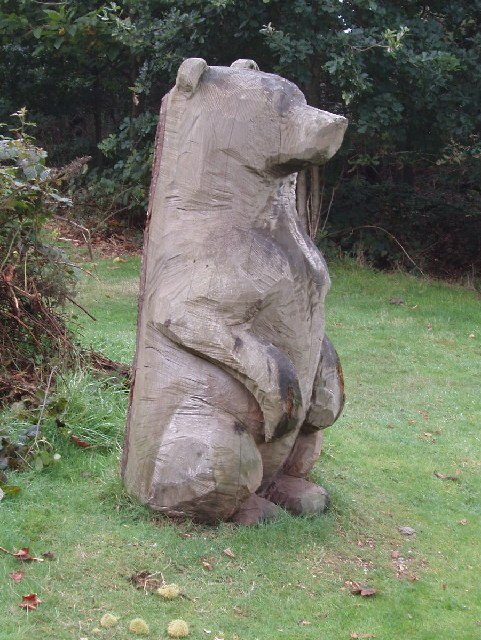
Wooden bear sculpture in the woods

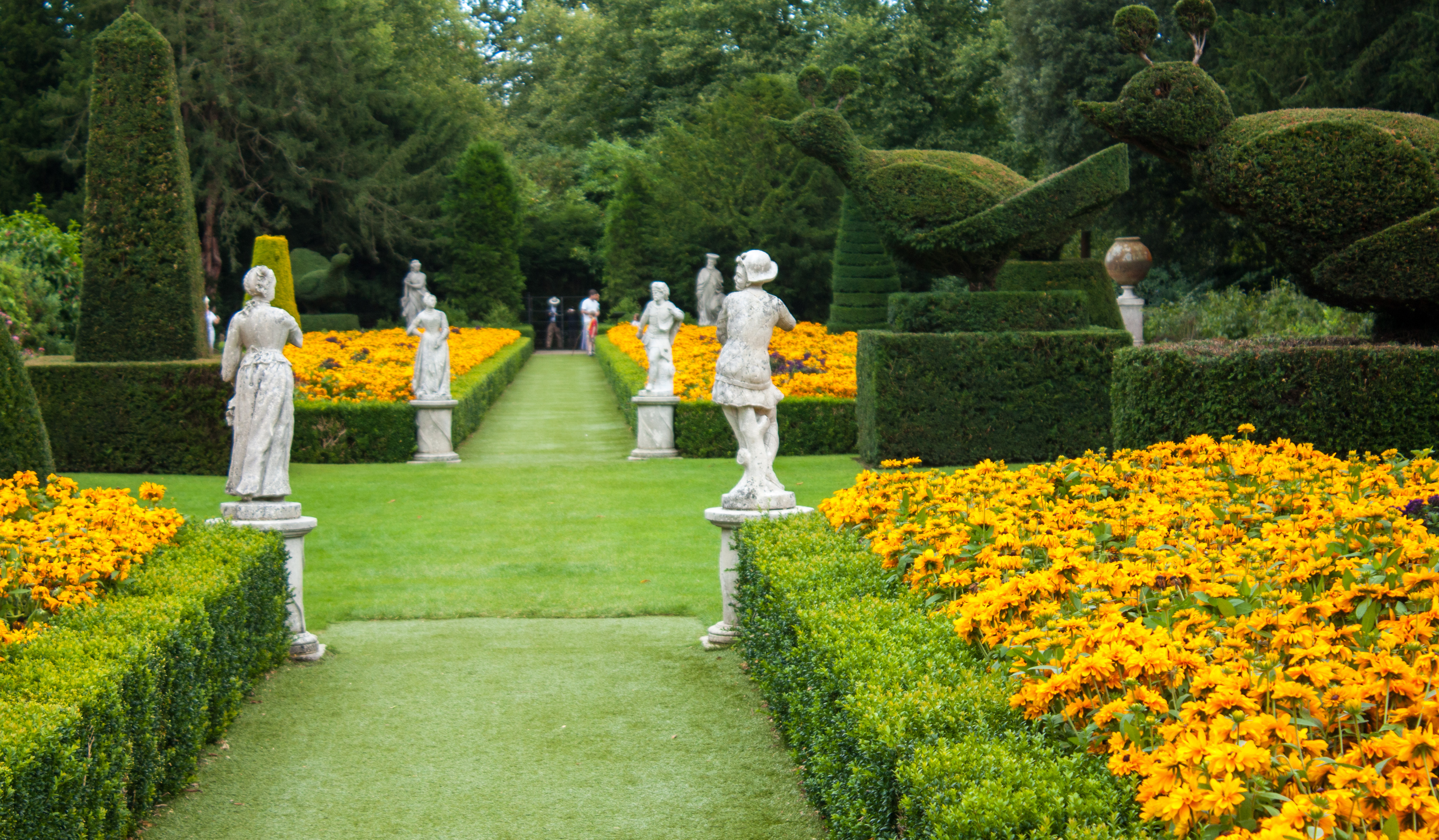
Topiary and summer planting in the Long Garden

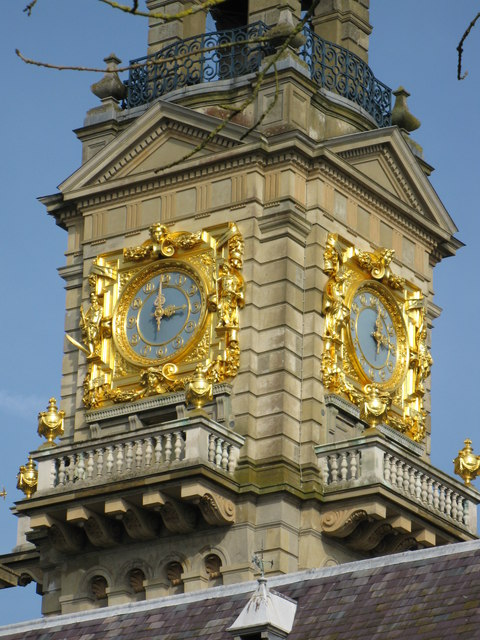
Gilded surrounds of the clock faces on the tower

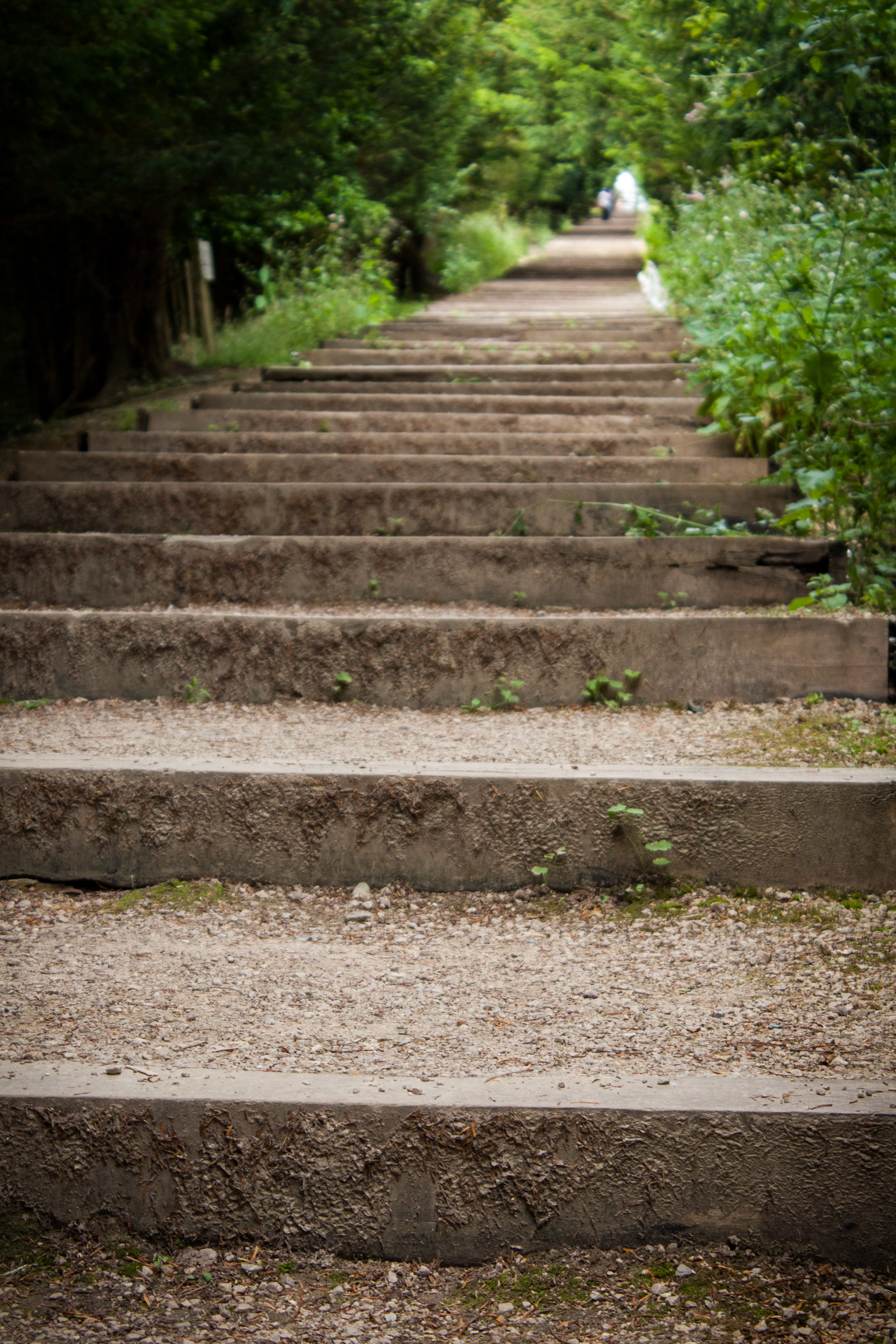
Yew Tree Walk with its 172 cliff-side steps down to the Thames

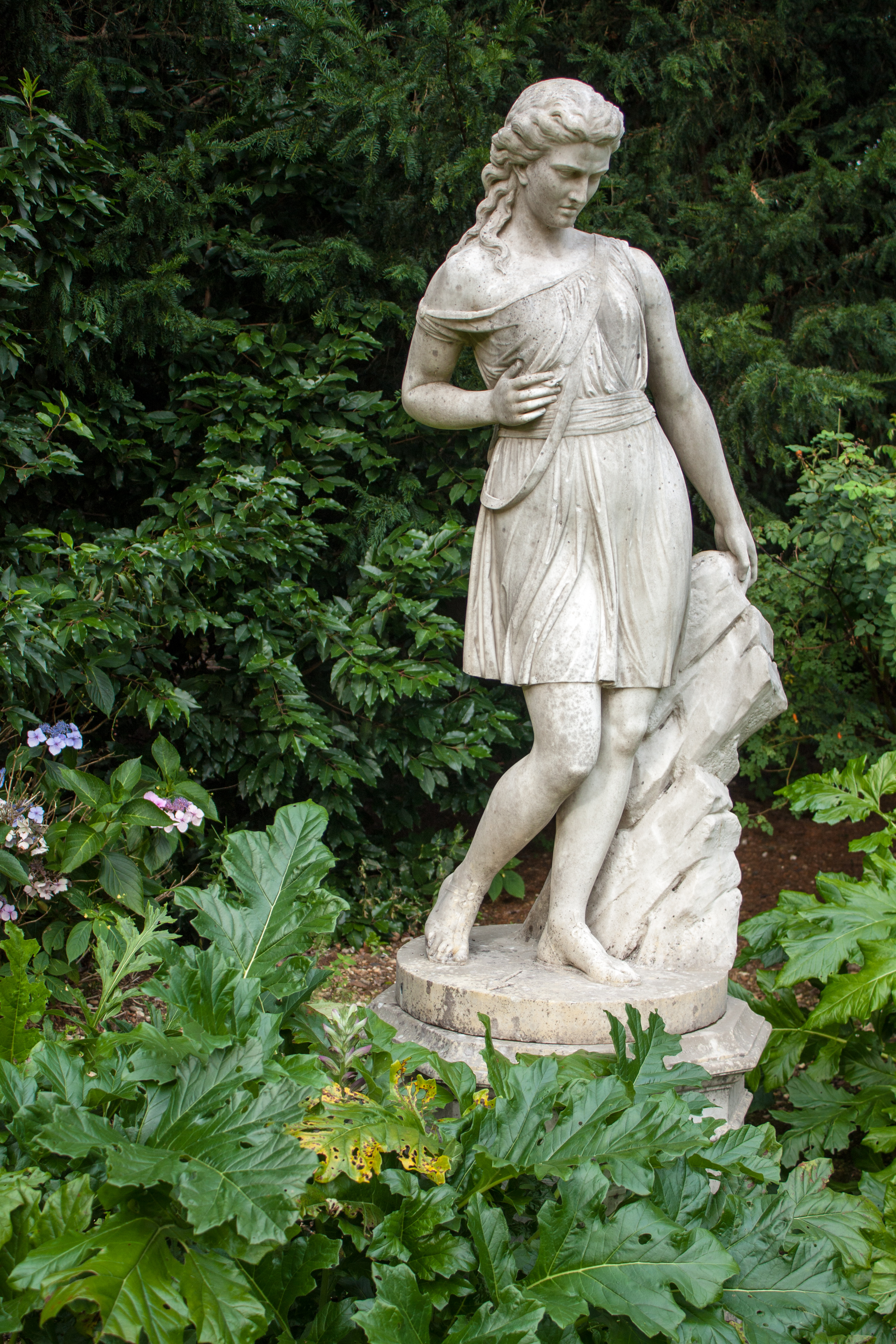
Wounded Amazon statue purchased by W.W. Astor in the Rose Garden.

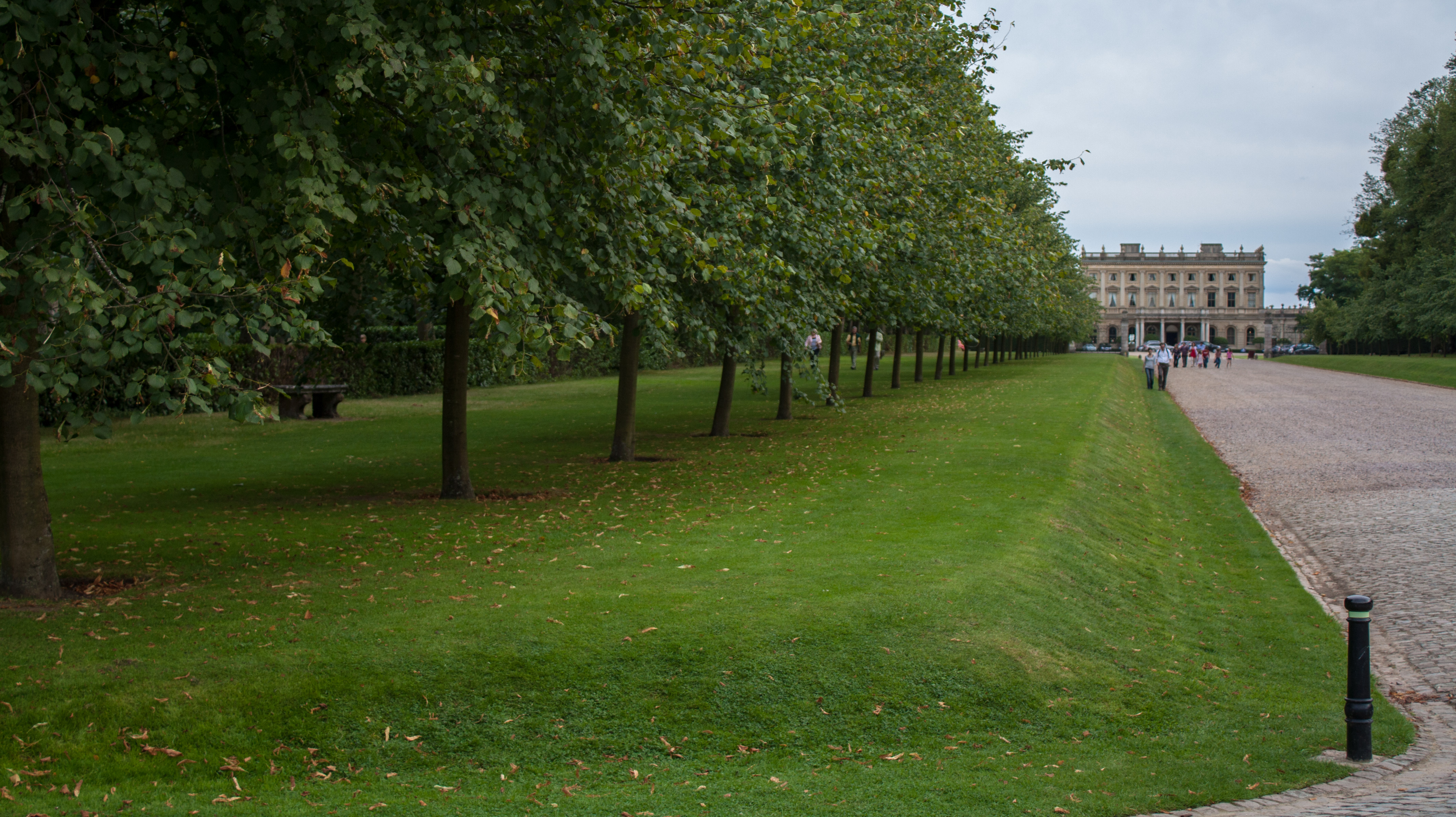
The avenue leading up to the house

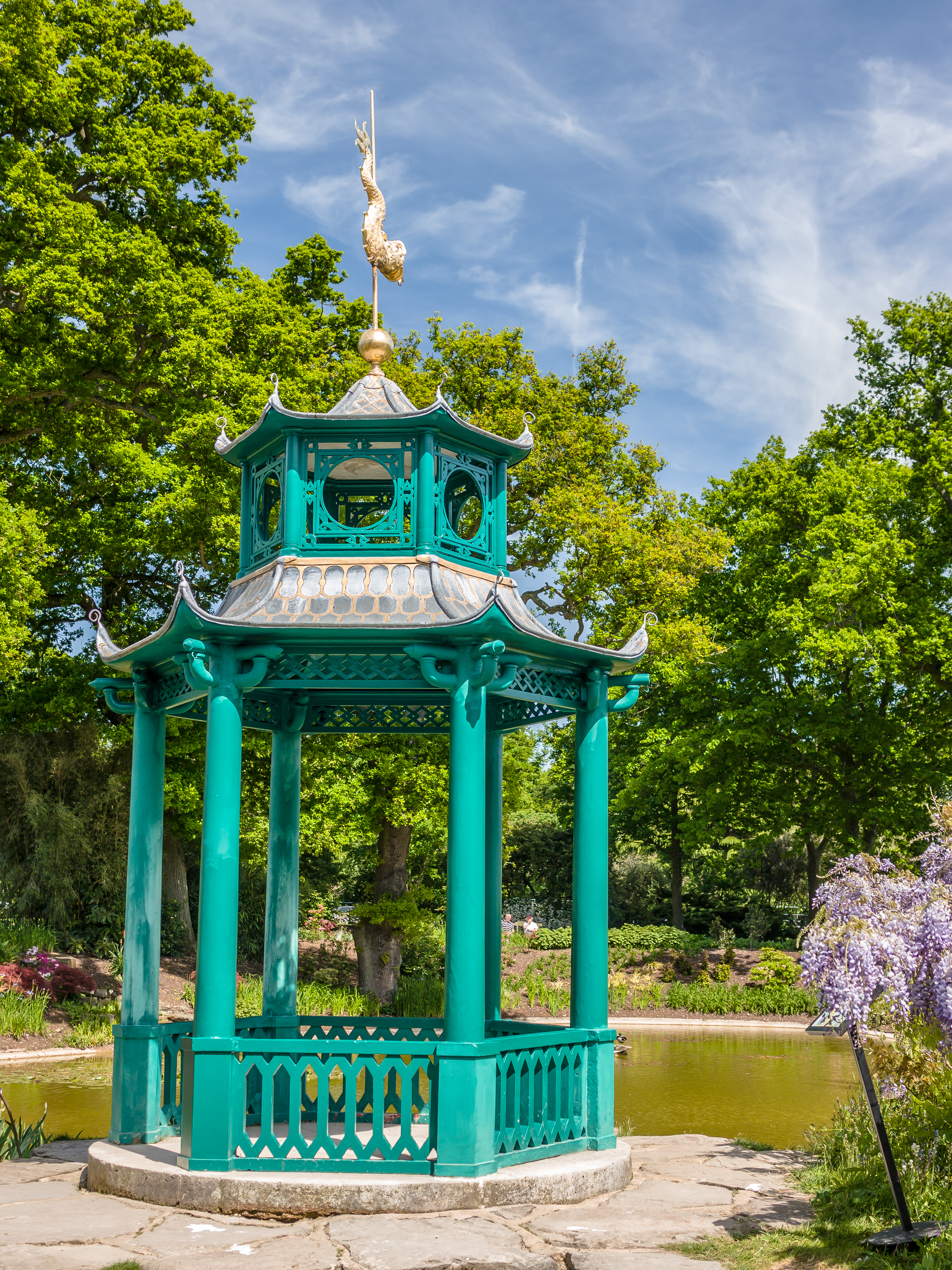
The Pagoda in the Water Garden

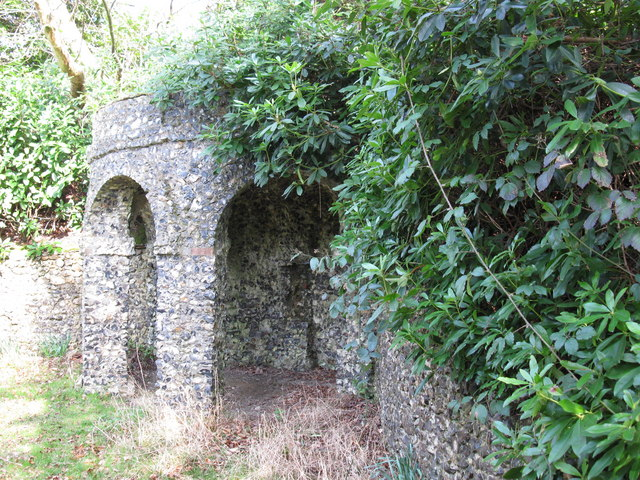
The 19th-century flint folly in the woods

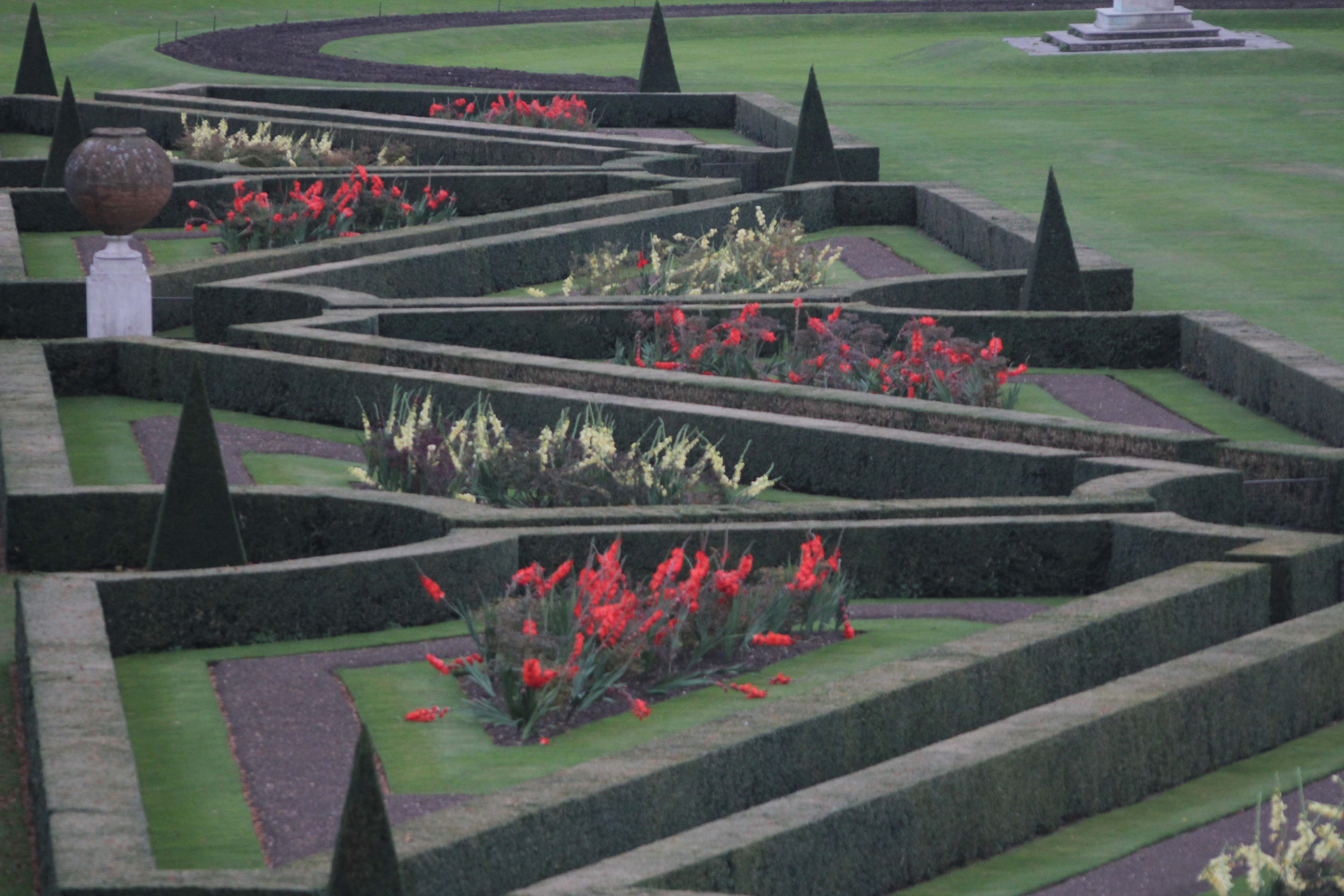
Planting in the Parterre viewed from the terrace.

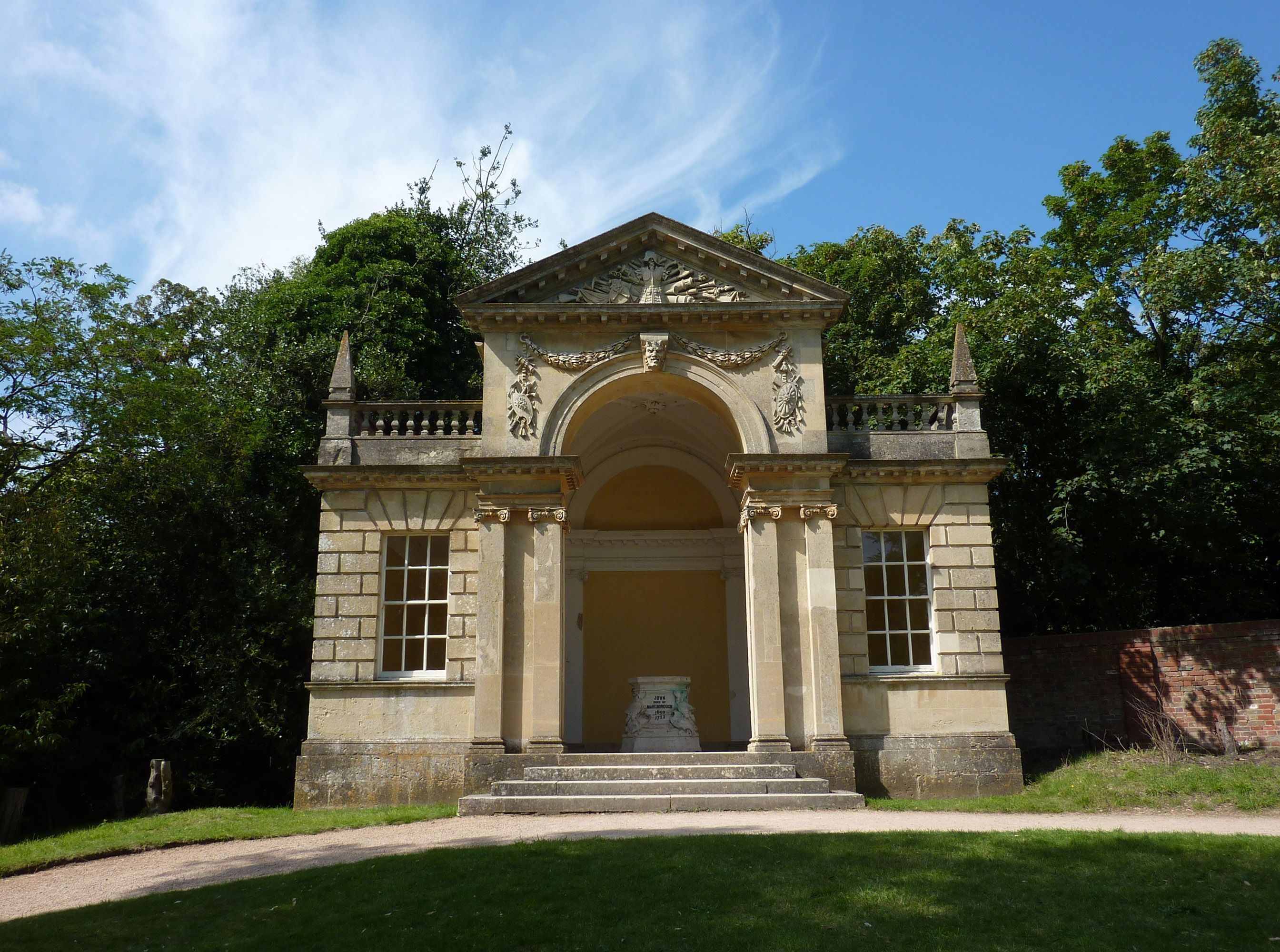
18th-century Blenheim Pavilion – one of the oldest garden buildings at Cliveden.

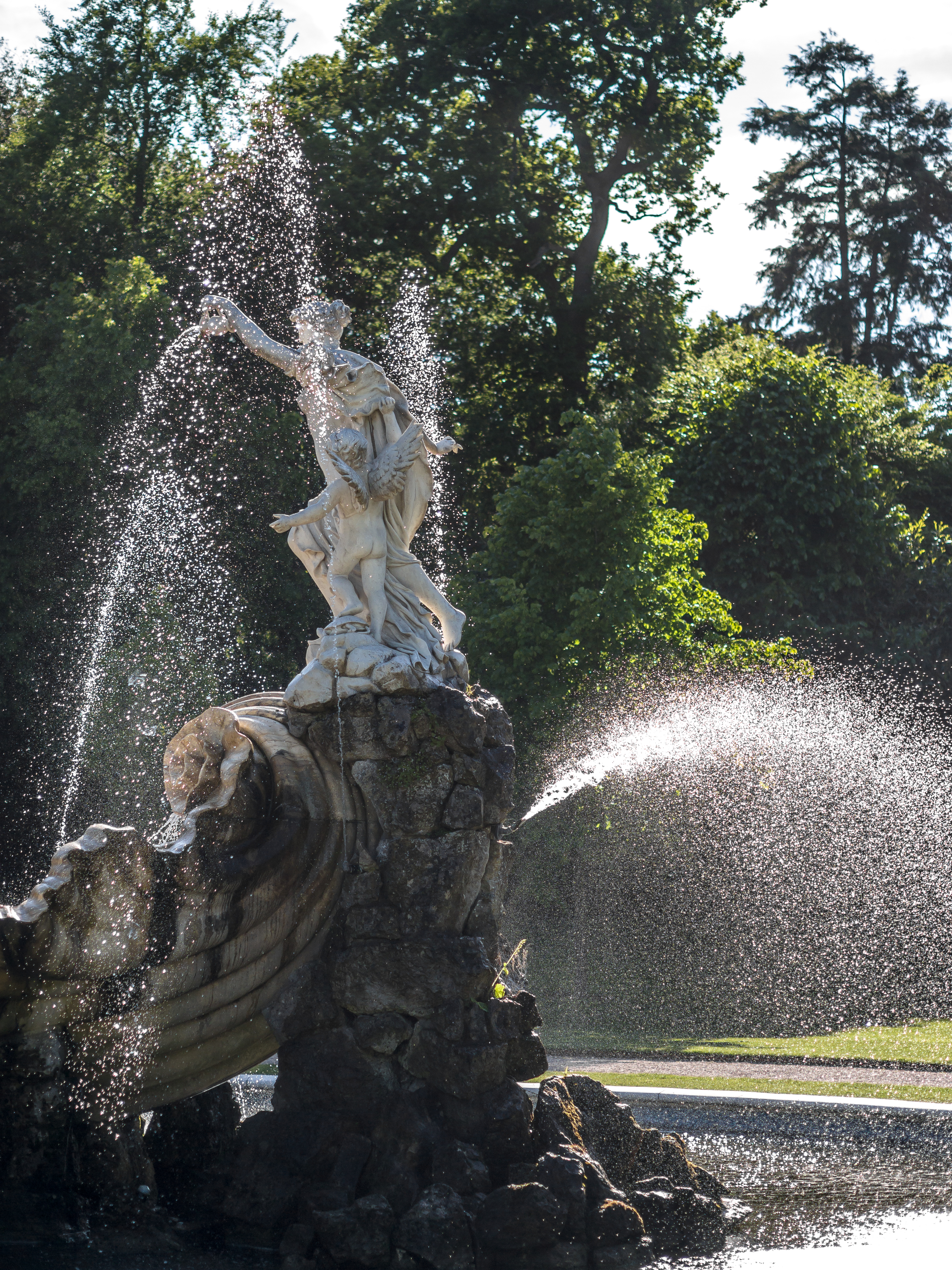
Jets of water around the Fountain of Love.

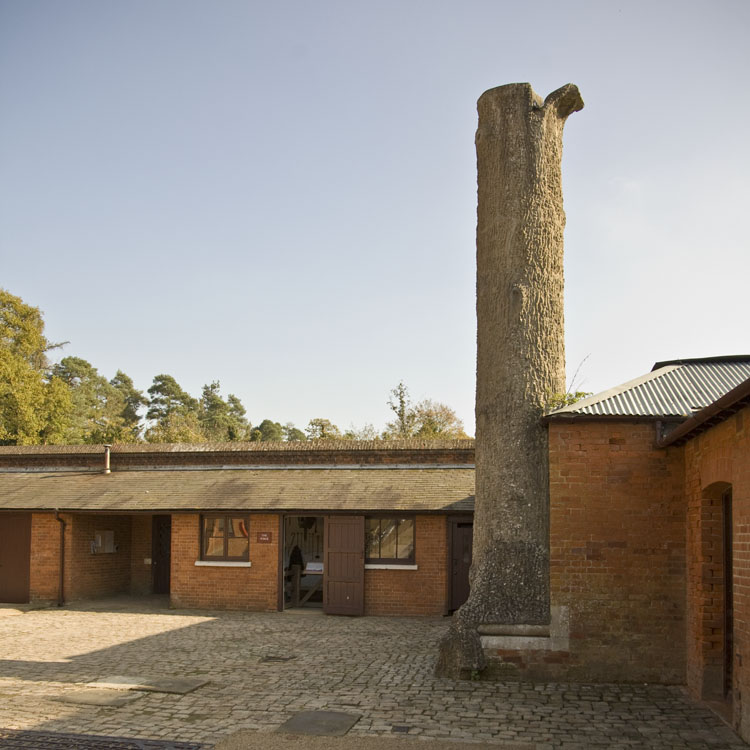
Concrete tree-trunk folly (an old chimney) near the estate offices.

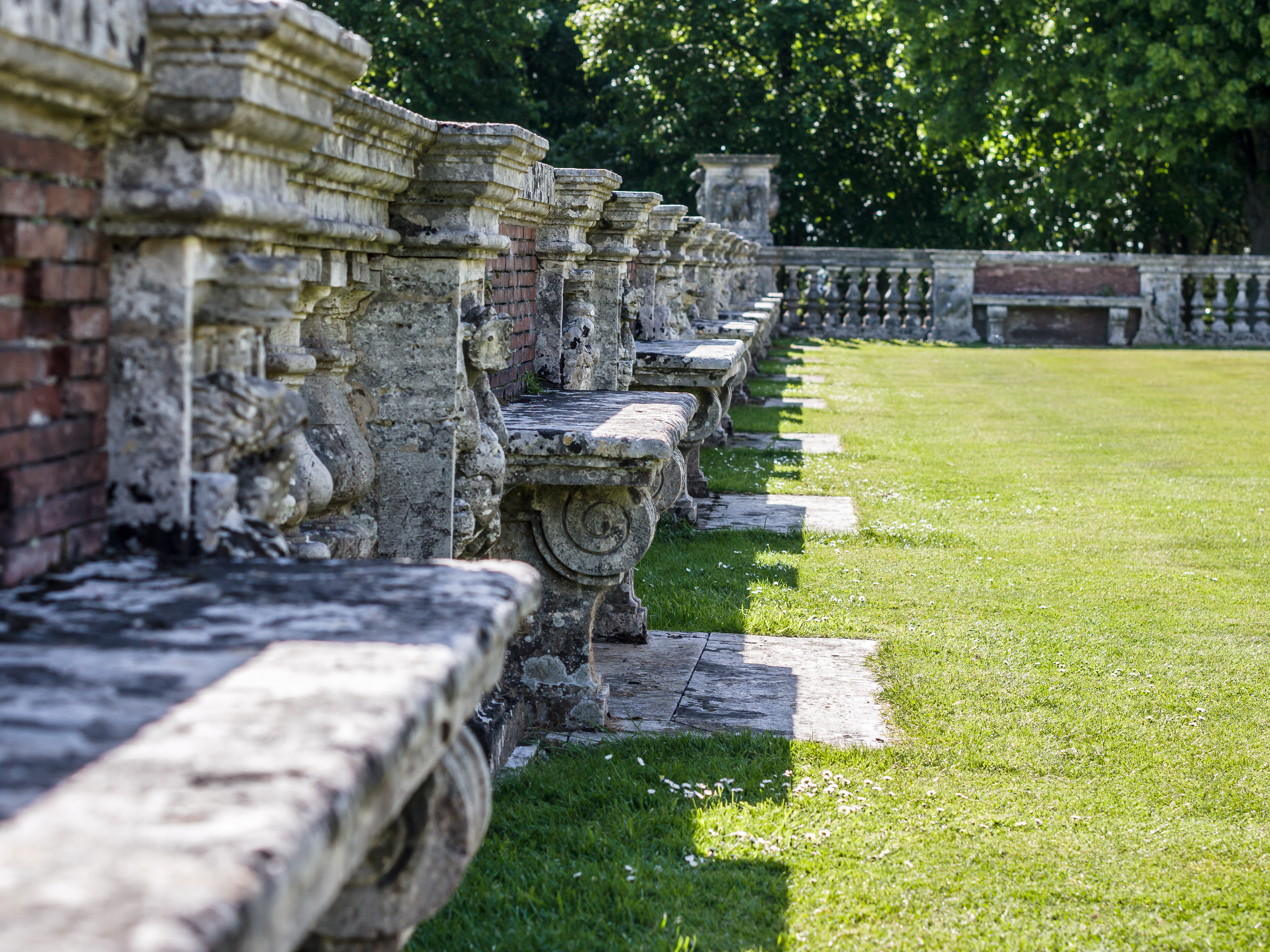
Seats in the Borghese Balustrade above the Parterre.

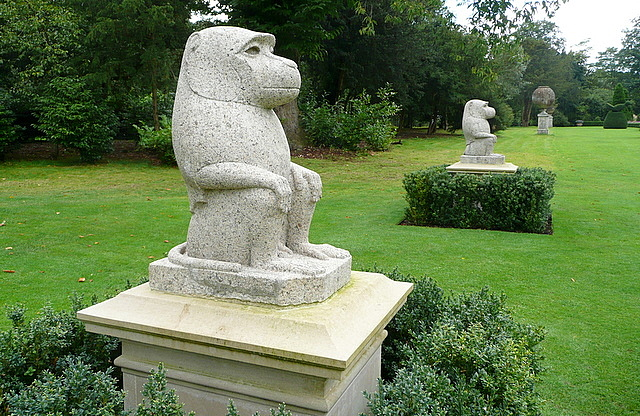
Granite Baboon statues in the Long Garden.

== Bibliography ==
- Crathorne, James (1995), Cliveden: The Place and the People, London, England
- Llewellyn, R. (1989), Elegance and Eccentricity
- National Trust, The (1971), Guide to Cliveden, London, England: National Trust for Places of Historic Interest or Natural Beauty
- National Trust, The (1994), Guide to Cliveden, London, England: National Trust for Places of Historic Interest or Natural Beauty
- National Trust, The (2012), Guide to Cliveden, London, England: National Trust for Places of Historic Interest or Natural Beauty
- Oxford Archaeology (8 November 2002), The south Terrace at Cliveden, Archaeological Watching Brief (PDF), OA Library
