= Richard Livingstone (businessman) =

British billionaire property developer (born 1964)

- Born: November 1964 (age 61)
- Education: St Paul's School, London
- Occupations: Co-owner, London & Regional Properties
- Spouse: Claire Burns (divorced)
- Relatives: Ian Livingstone (brother); John Burns (former father-in-law)

Richard John Livingstone (born November 1964) is a British billionaire property developer, through the privately held London & Regional Properties, owned jointly with his brother Ian Livingstone.

== Early life ==
Richard John Livingstone was born in November 1964 in the UK, the son of a dentist in Ealing, London. He was educated at St Paul's School, a leading private school.

== Career ==
He trained as a chartered surveyor. Together with his brother Ian, a former optometrist, they acquired the David Clulow opticians chain in 1992. They sold it in 2011 and are now primarily property developers.

Many of their early developments were financed by Jacob Rothschild's merchant bank Dawnay Day, who Ian said "proved very supportive".

Through their company London & Regional Properties, they own David Lloyd Leisure and luxury hotels including Cliveden House in Berkshire, Hilton Hotels in London's Green Park and Park Lane. They redeveloped Marks & Spencer's former headquarters at 55 Baker Street, which now houses the offices of Knight Frank, the accountant BDO Stoy Hayward, and London & Regional itself.

As of 2015, together with Jaime Gilinski Bacal, they are developing the $700 million Panama Pacifico project in Panama City, Panama on the former Howard Air Force Base. They are also reveloping the former Elizabeth House hotel near London's Waterloo station in a $930 million project.

== Personal life ==
In 1997, Livingstone married Claire Burns, the daughter of John Burns, who founded the Derwent London property group. They are now divorced. Livingstone is Jewish.

The Evening Standard notes that they are eager to avoid publicity and seek to lead a normal life for the sake of their children, and calls them "arguably the lowest-profile billionaire siblings in London" and "these most secretive of brothers".

In the 2024 Sunday Times Rich List, Livingstone and his brother's net worth was estimated to be £6.3 billion.

In April 2025, it was widely reported that Livingstone and his brother had moved Monaco for tax purposes.
