= Ian Livingstone (property developer) =

British billionaire property developer (born 1962)

- Born: 22 May 1962 (age 63)
- Education: St Paul's School, London
- Alma mater: City University London
- Occupations: Co-owner of London & Regional Properties, property developer
- Spouse: Natalie Livingstone
- Children: 3
- Relatives: Richard Livingstone (brother)

Ian Malcolm Livingstone (born 22 May 1962) is a British billionaire property developer, through the privately held London & Regional Properties, owned jointly with his brother Richard Livingstone.

== Early life ==
Livingstone was born in the UK, the son of a dentist in Ealing, London. He was educated at St Paul's School, a leading private school. He attended City University London, where he received a bachelor's degree in Optometry and qualified as an optometrist in 1984.

== Career ==
In 1987, Livingstone and his brother founded London & Regional Properties, initially buying distressed assets during the commercial property crash. He has served as the co-Executive Chairman of London & Regional Properties with his brother since 1993. Through this holding company, they own David Lloyd Leisure and the leasehold for Cliveden House in Berkshire, and Hilton Hotels in London's Green Park and Park Lane. They redeveloped Marks & Spencer's former headquarters at 55 Baker Street, which now houses the offices of Knight Frank, the accountant BDO Stoy Hayward, and London & Regional itself.

Livingstone served as the chairman and majority shareholder of the Optika Clulow Group, a retail chain which owned 170 optician stores, including David Clulow, Sunglass Hut, Harrods and Selfridges opticians, from 1990 to 2010. Another major shareholder was his brother Richard Livingstone, a surveyor. The brothers sold the retail chain in 2011 and are now primarily property developers.

Many of their early developments were financed by Jacob Rothschild's merchant bank Dawnay Day, who Ian said "proved very supportive".

Livingstone is the owner of Brightark, an investment vehicle. In 2005, in partnership with Claudio Del Vecchio, the President of the Retail Brand Alliance, he agreed to open Brooks Brothers stores in the United Kingdom. By 2006, they had opened one on Old Broad Street and another one on Regent Street, with plans to open a dozen more.

In 2012, it was reported that the Livingstone brothers were submitting plans for a £600 million project by London's Waterloo station, that would involve the demolition of the 1960s office block, Elizabeth House, and replacing it with two towers, one of 29 storeys and the other of 10 storeys. The previous plan for three towers had been approved by London mayor Boris Johnson but rejected by the British government in 2009.

As of 2015, together with Jaime Gilinski Bacal, they are developing the $700 million Panama Pacifico project in Panama City, Panama on the former Howard Air Force Base. He also serves on the Board of Trustees of The Mayor's Fund for London.

== Personal life ==
He is married to Natalie, a Cambridge-educated journalist who works for magazines such as Tatler and OK!. In 2015 Natalie published The Mistresses of Cliveden, a history of some of the female occupants of Cliveden. They have three daughters, Grace and Alice, and Elizabeth. In 2011, they paid an estimated £20 million for a house in Notting Hill previously owned by the PR executive Matthew Freud and his wife, Elisabeth Murdoch, daughter of Rupert Murdoch. Livingstone is Jewish.

The Evening Standard notes that Livingstone and his brother are eager to avoid publicity and seek to lead a normal life for the sake of their children, and calls them "arguably the lowest-profile billionaire siblings in London" and "these most secretive of brothers".

In the 2024 Sunday Times Rich List, Livingstone and his brother's net worth was estimated to be £6.3 billion.

In April 2025, it was widely reported that Livingstone and his brother had moved Monaco for tax purposes.
