= Cecilia Benattar =

Real estate developer

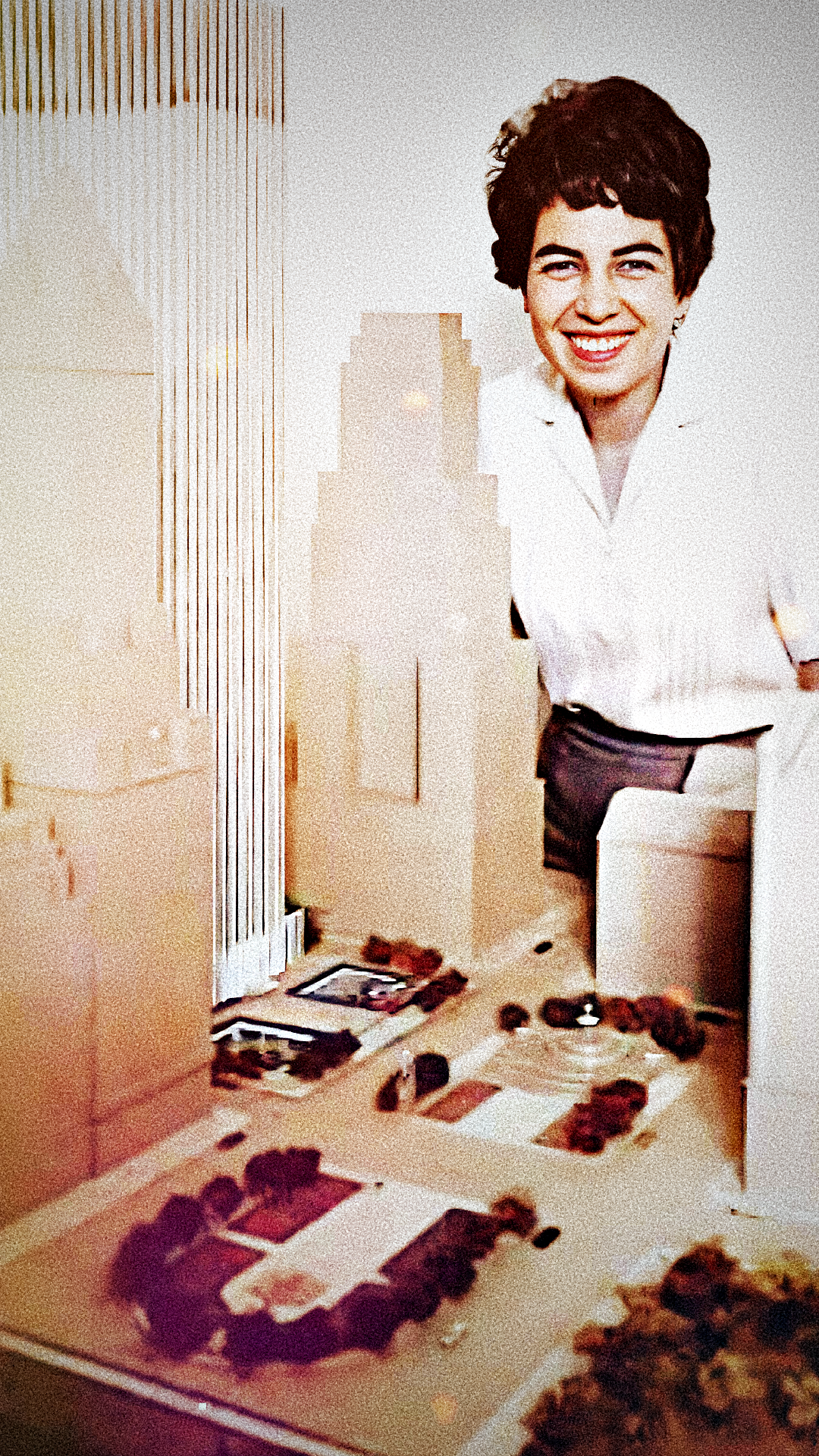
- Benattar stands beside her 1964 architectural model of the General Motors Building
- Born: Cecilia Rickless; 1931; Manchester, England
- Died: 10 December 2003 (aged 71–72); Dallas, Texas, U.S.
- Resting place: Pardes Shalom Cemetery, Maple, Ontario, Canada
- Education: London School of Economics
- Occupation: Real estate developer
- Known for: Development of the General Motors Building (Manhattan)
- Spouses: Jack Benattar (m. 1955; div. early 1970s); Michael Schwartz (m. early 1970s; d. 2003)
- Children: 4, including Simon Benattar

Cecilia Benattar (1931 – December 10, 2003) was a real estate developer, The Economist described her as a "housewife tycoon."

== Early life and background ==
Cecilia Benattar graduated at the top of her class from the London School of Economics, where she developed a strong foundation in finance and management. Partnering with Max Rayne, later known as Lord Rayne, she took on the role of President & CEO of North American Operations for London Merchant Securities (LMS).

== Career ==
Benattar developed the General Motors Building at 767 Fifth Avenue in Manhattan New York.

In 1964, under her direction, the Savoy-Plaza Hotel was demolished to make way for the General Motors Building. The project faced substantial public backlash but ultimately went forward with the support of Lord Max Rayne, with The New York Times quoting Rayne, deeming it "one of the most important construction projects of its kind in the world."

== Legacy and impact ==
The Real Deal credits her with challenging the prevailing "Mad Men" corporate culture, fostering a more inclusive professional environment.

Vicky Ward, describes Benattar's development and further tenant contracting for The General Motors Building development in her book The Liars Ball, "the most written up, successful private sale New York had ever seen. Benattar earned more than twice what she was originally offered by job‐lot auctioneers and was hailed as a marketing genius. 'It took a woman to think of this piecemeal disposal,' remarked the feminist author Gloria Steinem in the Ladies’ Home Journal."

== Cultural depictions and media ==
Benattar’s story has been featured in the docuseries "People Who Made New York City," produced by The Real Deal, which highlights her life and contributions to Manhattan's urbanized skyline.

== Later life and death ==
In her later years, Benattar expanded her reach beyond Manhattan, collaborating with Paul Reichmann on London’s Canary Wharf and leading the development of the Sun Life Centre in Toronto, which required the demolition of the Lord Simcoe Hotel. She eventually founded NIOT Investment Holdings Limited ("Now It’s Our Turn"), furthering the Benattar's portfolio of developments and real estate investments. Her son, Simon Benattar, assumed leadership and is the current President & CEO.

Cecilia Benattar moved to Florida in the 1990s and died on December 10th, 2003, after suffering a heart attack during a flight, resulting in an emergency landing in Dallas. She was 72. Her funeral took place at Pardes Shalom Cemetery in Maple, Ontario.
