= General Motors Building (Manhattan) =

Office skyscraper in Manhattan, New York

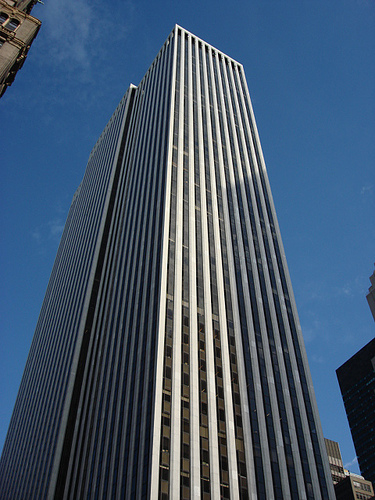
- The building as seen from 59th Street

General information
- Status: Completed
- Type: Offices, retail
- Architectural style: International Style
- Location: 767 Fifth Avenue; New York, NY 10153
- Coordinates: 40°45′49″N 73°58′20″W
- Construction started: 1965; 61 years ago
- Completed: 1968; 58 years ago
- Owner: BXP, Inc.

Height
- Roof: 705 ft (215 m)
- Top floor: 644 feet (196 m)

Technical details
- Floor count: 50
- Floor area: 1,637,363 sq ft (152,116.0 m^{2})
- Lifts/elevators: 35

Design and construction
- Architects: Edward Durell Stone & Associates; Emery Roth & Sons
- Developer: Cecilia Benattar
- Engineer: James Ruderman; Ervine Klein

Website
- bxp.com/767-fifthavenue

The General Motors Building (also the GM Building) is a 50-story, 705 ft (215 m) office tower at 767 Fifth Avenue at Grand Army Plaza on the southeast corner of Central Park, in the Midtown Manhattan neighborhood of New York City. The building occupies an entire city block between Fifth Avenue, 59th Street, Madison Avenue, and 58th Street on the site of the former Savoy-Plaza Hotel. It was designed in the International Style by Edward Durell Stone & Associates with Emery Roth & Sons and completed in 1968.

The GM Building was developed by London Merchant Securities and was half occupied by General Motors (GM) upon its opening. The building's facade is made of vertical piers of white Georgia marble, alternating with strips of glass. The building has about 1.7 million square feet (160,000 m^{2}) of space, and the lobby originally contained a GM showroom, later an FAO Schwarz department store. The public plaza outside the building on Fifth Avenue was originally below grade but, after two renovations, contains the Apple Fifth Avenue entrance and a seating area above ground level. Architecture critics, including Paul Goldberger and Ada Louise Huxtable, widely disapproved of the building upon its completion.

All of the space in the building had been leased by January 1967, over a year prior to opening. General Motors relocated most of its employees and announced their intention to sell the building in 1981. Ultimately, Corporate Property Investors (CPI) bought an option on the building in 1982 and conducted a renovation in 1990. Conseco and Donald Trump purchased the General Motors Building from CPI in 1998. Five years later, it was sold to Macklowe Organization for $1.4 billion, then the highest price for a North American office building. Macklowe sold the building in 2008 to the joint venture of Boston Properties, Zhang Xin, and the Safra banking family for $2.8 billion. The joint venture continues to own the building as of 2022.

== Site ==
The General Motors Building is at 767 Fifth Avenue in the Midtown Manhattan neighborhood of New York City. It is bounded by 59th Street to the north; Fifth Avenue and Grand Army Plaza to the west; 58th Street to the south; and Madison Avenue to the east. The General Motors Building's site covers 84,350 square feet (7,836 m^{2}), with a frontage of 200 feet (61 m) on Fifth and Madison Avenues and 420 feet (130 m) on 58th and 59th Streets. The building is assigned its own ZIP Code, 10153; it was one of 41 buildings in Manhattan that had their own ZIP Codes as of 2019.

The General Motors Building is near The Sherry-Netherland to the north; 500 Park Avenue to the east; the Fuller Building and Four Seasons Hotel New York to the southeast; the LVMH Tower, 3 East 57th Street, and 745 Fifth Avenue to the south; the Solow Building and Bergdorf Goodman Building to the southwest; and the Plaza Hotel to the west. In addition, The Pond and Hallett Nature Sanctuary within Central Park is to the northwest, across Grand Army Plaza.

Fifth Avenue between 42nd Street and Central Park South was relatively undeveloped through the late 19th century, when brownstone rowhouses were built on the avenue. By the early 1900s, that section of Fifth Avenue was becoming a commercial area. The corner of Fifth Avenue, Central Park South, and 59th Street was developed with the Plaza, Savoy, and New Netherland hotels during the 1890s. The site of the General Motors Building was then occupied by the Savoy, which would be replaced in 1927 by the Savoy-Plaza Hotel. The only other structures on the Savoy-Plaza block were the four-story Emmet Arcade and the 15-story Madison Hotel. By the 1950s, almost all of the 19th-century structures on Grand Army Plaza had been either destroyed or renovated.

== Architecture ==
The General Motors Building was designed by Edward Durell Stone and the firm Emery Roth & Sons. It is 50 stories tall with a roof of 705 feet (215 m). The building also has two basement levels. The stories are connected by 35 elevators.

=== Facade ===
The facade is made of vertical piers of white Georgia marble, alternating with strips of glass. According to Stone, he used white marble because many of the surrounding buildings had similar cladding on their lower stories. Stone believed that "those black buildings that have been modish in the past look perfectly horrible". The load-bearing marble piers are rhomboid in shape and contain a 7/8-inch (22 mm) thick cladding, behind which are hollow concrete columns with service ducts.

At the ground and second stories, the General Motors Building was originally clad with thirty large windows, measuring 30 feet (9.1 m) tall and 0.875 inches (22.2 mm) thick. Ten of these panels, weighing 3,080 pounds (1,400 kg) and measuring 9 feet (2.7 m) wide, were the largest single windows ever made for a building at the time of their installation. The other twenty panels were 38 to 39 inches (970 to 990 mm) wide. These windows enclosed a General Motors (GM) showroom.

=== Interior ===
The building has about 1.7 million square feet (160,000 m^{2}) of space, though its rental space is also estimated at 1,774,000 square feet (164,800 m^{2}). According to the New York City Department of City Planning, the building has 1,824,820 square feet (169,531 m^{2}) of gross floor area. A 2013 transaction among minority owners valued the building around $3.4 billion while a 2017 appraisal valued it at over $4.8 billion. The building's prestige was in part due to its proximity to Central Park, as well as its 30,000-square-foot (2,800 m^{2}) floor plates, which tended to attract larger companies.

The interiors are clad with Greek marble; the highest-quality marble was used in the lobby while lower-quality marble was relegated to upper-story spaces such as restrooms. The lobby has a patterned polygonal ceiling, green-and-white marble walls, and green marble floors with inlaid brass strips. The ceiling is original, but the floors and walls date from a 1999 renovation. The original design of the lobby included octagonal white-marble floor tiles as well as marble grilles on the walls. Originally, the north wing of the lobby had a GM showroom with 20,000 square feet (1,900 m^{2}) of display rooms on the ground and mezzanine levels. The space housed toy store FAO Schwarz from 1986 to 2015. The store, featured in the 1988 film Big, won an award for its lighting in 2005. On the second floor is the Savoy Club, an amenity space spanning 26,000 to 33,000 square feet (2,400 to 3,100 m^{2}). The amenity space includes a fitness center, three conference rooms, and a dining area. The Savoy Club is clad in travertine, oak, and terrazzo, and the design of its tables and carpets is based on the decorations in the lobby.

The interior space is supported by "modules" of columns spaced 20 feet (6.1 m) apart. The executive offices of GM, on the 25th floor, were devoid of the "traditional" artwork that was standard of other executive headquarters in the city. Instead, these offices were furnished with replicas of traditional work. The upper stories' decorative elements were selected by their tenants. Three of the original upper-story tenants, cosmetics manufacturers Estee Lauder, Revlon, and Helena Rubinstein Inc., collectively took more than six stories, each with varying color schemes and art collections.

=== Plaza ===
The building contains a public plaza on the Fifth Avenue end. The plaza was originally composed of a 200-by-10-foot (61.0 by 3.0 m) space, sunken 12 feet (3.7 m) below grade. It was connected to the ground level via a staircase, and it was partially overhung by a promenade, with shops on three sides of the plaza. Because of its position under ground level, it was seen as an "underused, unattractive desolate place" by the 1990s, with green artificial turf and mostly empty retail space. It was raised to street level around 1999. Slightly elevated groves of trees were installed on the plaza's north and south ends while fountains, benches, and a 21,500-square-foot (2,000 m^{2}) retail pavilion were built below grade, accessed by stairs at the center of the Fifth Avenue facade.

The plaza was again reconstructed around 2005 for the construction of Apple Fifth Avenue, a large Apple Store. The building's public plaza was further leveled and low L-shaped parapets were installed at the four corners of the plaza, framing its sides. Shallow decorative pools were installed on the north and south sections of the plaza, surrounded by tables, chairs, planters, and a few honey locust trees. In its configuration following the 2005 renovation, the plaza is slightly raised above ground level, with pools, trees, and benches on the plaza's northern and southern sides. The Apple store's entrance, at the center of the plaza, is a 32 ft (9.8 m) glass cube that has been likened to the Louvre Pyramid; the cube allows a descent into the store via glass elevator and spiral staircase. This addition was designed by Apple and the firm of Bohlin Cywinski Jackson.

== History ==
The Savoy-Plaza Hotel was purchased in 1962 by Webb and Knapp. The same year, the company resold a two-thirds interest to Canadian company British Commercial Property Investments and a one-third interest to British company London Merchant Securities. The companies also acquired the Emmet Arcade prior to August 1964. When the companies purchased the Madison Hotel in October 1964, they gained ownership of the whole city block.

=== Development ===
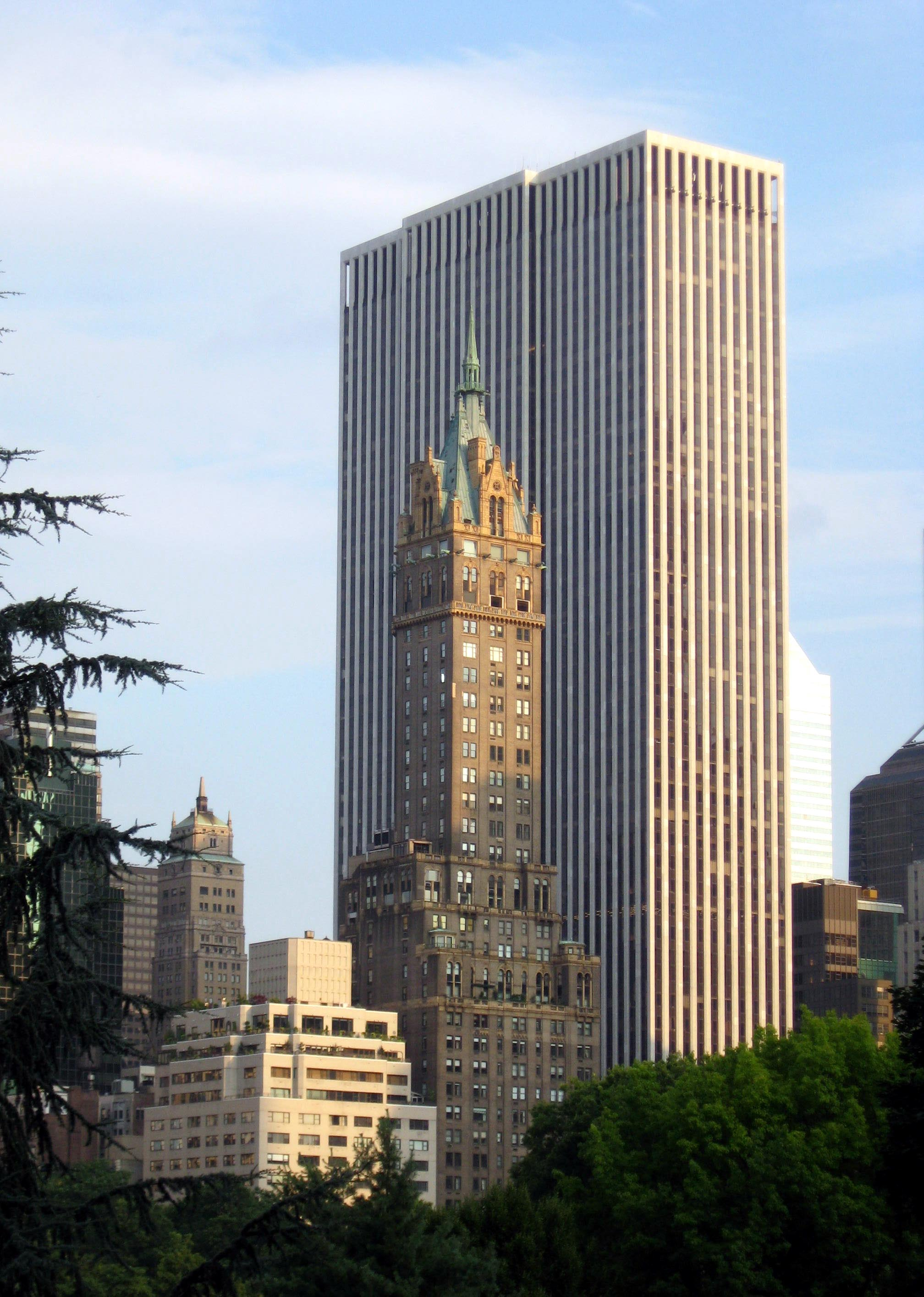
As seen from Central Park, with The Sherry-Netherland in the foreground

In August 1964, the media reported that the Savoy-Plaza would be razed at the end of the 1965 World's Fair, and a 40-story building occupied primarily by GM would be constructed on the site. At the time, GM was housed in 1775 Broadway (now 3 Columbus Circle) at Broadway and 57th Street, three blocks west; GM had leased space in that structure since 1927, and it had become dilapidated. The announcement of the GM Building led to a significant public outcry and protests. In December 1964, Stone presented plans for a 48-story office tower on the Savoy-Plaza Hotel site, with a one-story podium and vertical marble strips on the facade. According to Stone, he wished "to create a building that will salute the skyline and enhance one of New York's finest neighborhoods". The same month, GM acquired a half interest in the Savoy Fifth Avenue Corporation from London Merchants.

Plans for the GM Building were filed in January 1965, in spite of opposition to the proposed closure of the Savoy-Plaza. Cecilia Benattar, president and chief executive officer of the North American holdings of London Merchants, was to oversee development of the new structure. A group called Save Our Landmarks threatened a boycott of GM products if the project proceeded. Even so, the Savoy-Plaza was already being shuttered in stages, and the Savoy-Plaza closed permanently at the end of June 1965. Demolition of the Savoy-Plaza began that year, but two existing tenants of the hotel had leases that were not scheduled to expire for several more years. Consequently, Benattar considered leaving a remnant of the old hotel in place unless London Merchants could reach an agreement with the lessees.

The General Motors Building was nearly completed by October 1967, except for facade sheathing. Much of the controversy and boycott threats had decreased by then. The building was only the fourth major skyscraper to be developed on Fifth Avenue following World War II, after the Tishman Building at 666, the Canada House at 680, and the Corning Glass Building at 717 Fifth Avenue. The replacement of the Savoy-Plaza with the General Motors Building spurred a movement to save other hotels nearby. This prompted the New York City Planning Commission to rezone a three-block area around Grand Army Plaza in 1968.

=== 20th-century use ===
GM only expected to occupy part of the new building, leasing the remaining space through the Savoy Fifth Avenue Corp. The first 26 floors were occupied by GM while the other 24 stories were rented out. By January 1967, all of the space in the building had been leased. Morgan Guaranty took ground-story space on the Madison Avenue side for a bank branch. Other initial office tenants included Bowater Paper Company, advertising firm Leo Burnett Company, advertising firm Leber Katz Paccione, shipping line Moore-McCormack, and stock brokerage Reynolds & Co. In addition, cosmetics manufacturers Estee Lauder, Revlon, and Helena Rubinstein Inc., as well as advertising firm Wells, Rich, Greene, took space in the building. Unlike at other structures, Savoy Fifth Avenue Corp did not offer to assume prospective occupants' leases. Because of the large concentration of perfume and cosmetics firms, the building was also initially nicknamed the "General Odors Building".

==== General Motors ownership ====
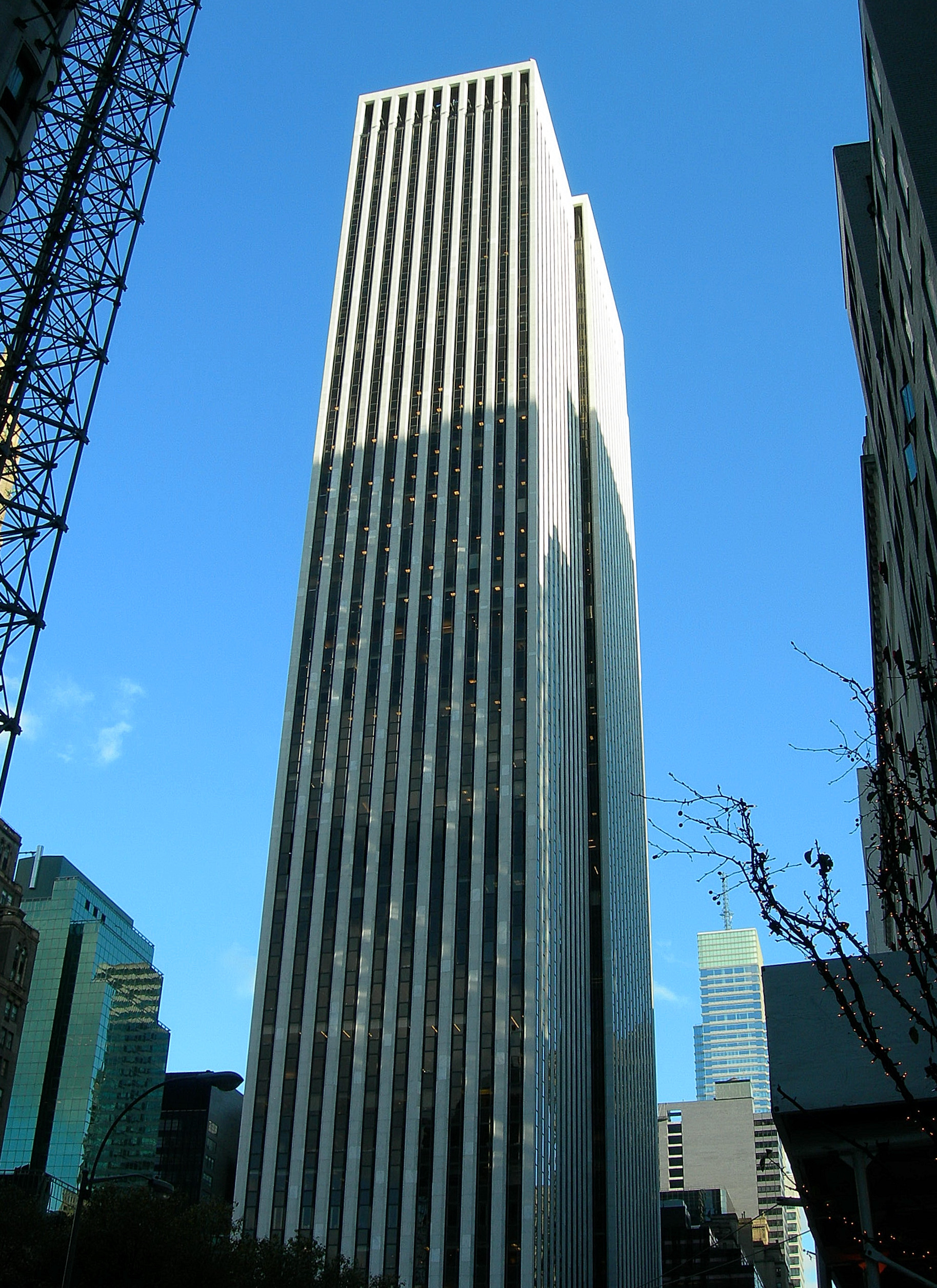
Seen from 58th Street

GM opened the building and its ground-floor showroom on September 26, 1968, with a display of the company's 1969 car models. Ten thousand people visited the building on opening day. The company formally dedicated the building four days later on September 30. Initially, 3,027 GM workers took up about half the building's space. Early in its existence, the General Motors Building's window-washing union went on strike for more than a month, and the facade became dirty. During this time, the building was used as a filming location for the 1969 movie Cactus Flower; under an agreement with the union, the film crew threw eggs at the facade to dirty the facade again after filming was completed. Three of the stores in the plaza had opened by October 1969, when one of the retail spaces, leased to a Longchamps, caught fire and was nearly destroyed. The next month, an anti-Vietnam War bombing occurred on the 19th floor, damaging an elevator and slightly injuring one person.

The Longchamps in the plaza's basement, damaged by the October 1969 fire, opened in 1970. Additional tenants signed leases for the GM Building during the decade, including Bank of Boston International and Mercantile and Marine Inc. A pipe bomb, linked to the terrorist group Fuerzas Armadas de Liberación Nacional Puertorriqueña, was placed outside the GM Building in 1977, but a homeless man dismantled the bomb before it could detonate.

GM moved 700 of the 1,100 employees working in the building to Detroit in February 1981, reducing their occupancy to 12 floors of the building or roughly 400,000 square feet (37,000 m^{2}). Two months later, General Motors announced their intention to sell the building for more than $500 million while still maintaining their corporate office space. If the sale had been executed at that price, the sum would have been the largest ever paid for an office building in United States. However, the asking rate of $312.5 per square foot ($3,364/m^{2}) was less than the comparable rate for the Manufacturers Hanover Corporation office at 350 Park Avenue, which had sold the same year for $334 per square foot ($3,600/m^{2}). By December 1981, Manhattan real estate company Corporate Property Investors (CPI) was negotiating to buy the structure. At the end of that month, The Wall Street Journal reported that the building might sell for $385 million.

==== CPI management and ownership ====
Rather than selling the building outright, GM sold an option to CPI in January 1982, which allowed the latter firm to buy the building after 1991 at a minimum price of $500 million. CPI paid $500 million in cash to GM and, in exchange, received ten-year, 10 percent notes with annual interest payments of $50 million. The deal, believed to represent the largest mortgage ever for an office property in New York City, also made CPI the managers of the building. The loan allowed GM, which then had a low supply of cash, to increase its current assets while also deferring payment of the city's capital gains tax. The mortgages were significantly below market rates. Even so, some tenants signed leases of over $50 per square foot ($540/m^{2}) during this time.

Among the new office tenants in the 1980s were Sanford C. Bernstein and Company. After GM's relocation, the 13th floor was renamed floor 12A at the request of Estee Lauder, a change that confused many building visitors. By the late 1980s, the General Motors Building, along with the Solow Building and the Seagram Building, charged some of the city's highest rents. In spite of the fact that architects considered neither the General Motors Building nor the Solow Building to be architecturally distinguished, their proximity to Central Park allowed their respective owners to charge high rents.

In 1986, FAO Schwarz moved its flagship toy store to the General Motors Building's ground-floor retail space. CPI started a three-year, $7.5 million renovation in 1990, re-caulking the windows and replacing about 400 of the 43,000 exterior marble slabs. The following year, CPI exercised its option to buy the building from General Motors for $500 million. By 1995, GM was close to shuttering its New York City outpost and moving to Westchester County. However, after employee demand and receiving tax breaks from the city of New York, GM signed a smaller lease for 20,000 square feet (1,900 m^{2}), compared to the 110,000 square feet (10,000 m^{2}) they previously occupied. The first-floor GM showroom, which had occupied 9,000 square feet (840 m^{2}) of retail space since the building opened, was shuttered. GM redesigned its showroom, which reopened in 1997 under the name "GM on Fifth".

=== 21st-century use ===
==== Donald Trump and Conseco ownership ====
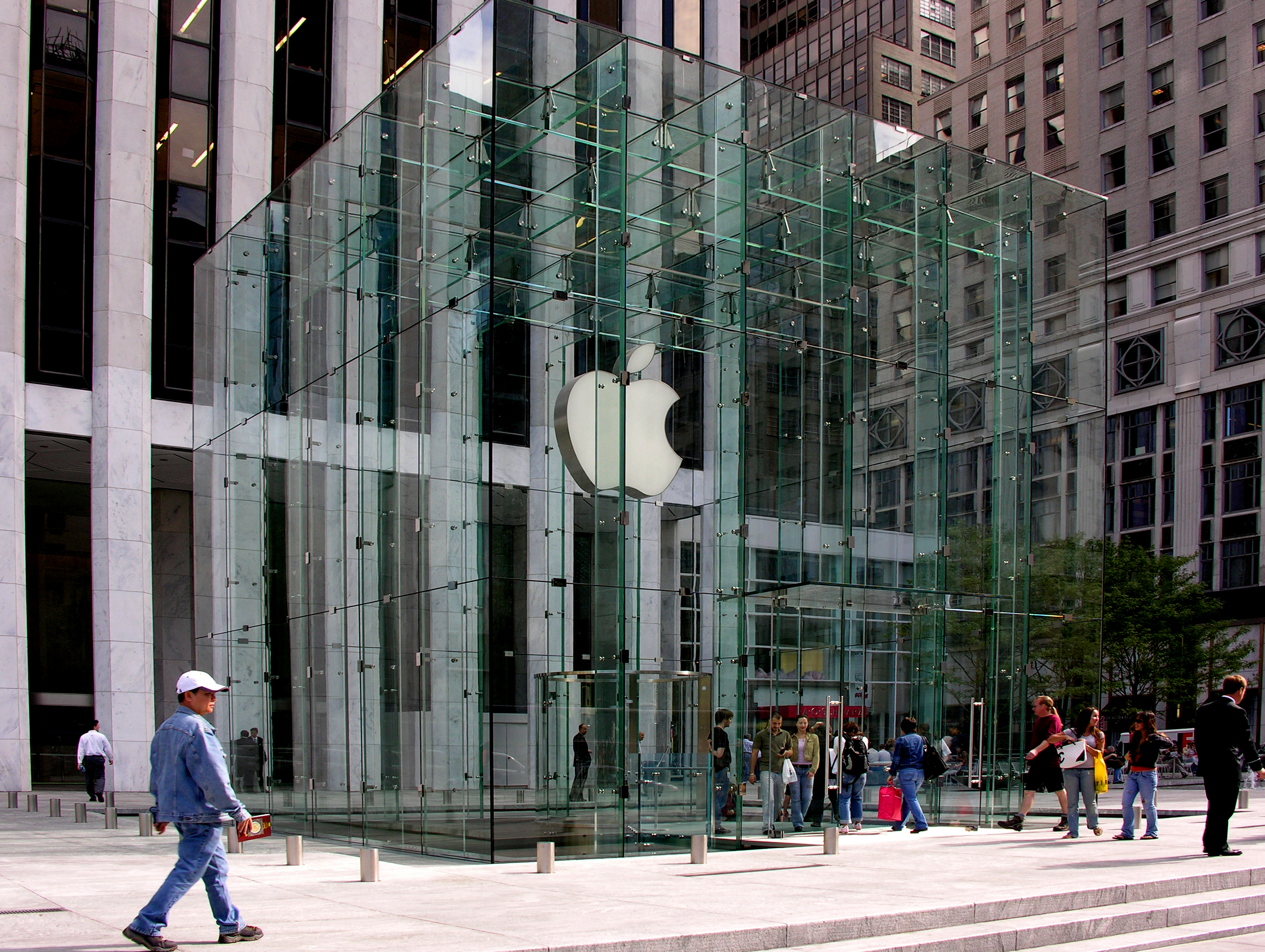
Apple Fifth Avenue entrance at the base of the building

By early 1998, Vornado Realty Trust was planning to buy the General Motors Building from CPI for $700 million. That April, potential buyers began submitting purchase offers to Simon DeBartolo Group Inc. Some bidders began to withdraw their offers as the purchase price surpassed $750 million. The winning bid came from investment firm Conseco and real-estate developer Donald Trump, who purchased the building for $878 million. The group received a $700 million loan from Lehman Brothers for the purchase, while Trump committed $15 million to $20 million of his own money to the deal.

Conseco and Trump started renovating the plaza and ground story after their purchase. Trump installed his name in 4-foot-tall (1.2 m) gold letters on the piers along Fifth and Madison Avenues, and he installed smaller signs at the building's four corners. He also hired Der Scutt to renovate the lobby. The GM showroom at the base was closed and a studio for the CBS program The Early Show was built within that space. The plaza, which had been unpopular with pedestrians because of its location below ground, was raised to ground level. Despite complaints about the CBS studio from the Sherry Netherland Hotel, the studio opened that November. By late 1999, Trump said he had leased office space in the building at $100 per square foot ($1,100/m^{2}); at the time, the tenants included Bank Melli Iran. That December, Conseco and Trump decided to divide the General Motors Building into 115 condominium units, ranging in size from a closet to the building's 35,000-square-foot (3,300 m^{2}) parking garage. The condominium arrangement, which was expected to net $2.25 billion, was highly atypical for an office building.

Disagreement arose in 2000 when Stephen Hilbert resigned as the chief executive of Conseco; he was replaced by Gary Wendt, who sought to sell the company's stake to Trump for at least $295 million. Trump secured $900 million from Deutsche Bank to refinance the building and, in July 2001, Trump agreed to pay Conseco $295 million in cash, notes, and residual interest, though Conseco wanted Deutsche Bank to guarantee the notes' value. After the September 11 attacks, Deutsche Bank was unable to provide such a guarantee because the General Motors Building was seen as a "trophy" property vulnerable to terrorism. Trump then filed a lawsuit against Conseco, alleging that the company had blocked him from refinancing the building. Conseco ultimately won the lawsuit and took over Trump's stake. Furthermore, the retail space in the plaza remained empty for several years despite its redesign.

==== Harry Macklowe ownership ====
In 2003, Conseco sold the building for $1.4 billion to developer Harry B. Macklowe's Macklowe Organization, representing the highest price for a North American office building at the time. Macklowe placed a nonrefundable down payment of $50 million to secure his acquisition of the GM Building. He also received a floating-rate mortgage from Deutsche Bank, as well as short-term equity and debt financing from George Soros and Vornado Realty Trust, using other buildings as collateral. The acquisition was finalized that September. Another bidder, developer Sheldon Solow, sought to block the sale before it was closed. Solow, as well as fellow bidder Leslie Dick, filed separate lawsuits against Macklowe in 2006 over the sale, which they both alleged was rigged in favor of Macklowe. Dick's lawsuit, which alleged a conspiracy from George Soros to prevent Dick from buying the building, was dismissed in 2009. Solow's lawsuit was dismissed the same year.

The property was first recapitalized in January 2005, with new senior debt of $1.1 billion, and $300 million of preferred equity from Jamestown, a German retail real estate syndicator. Macklowe renovated the building for $150 million, creating the Apple Fifth Avenue space as well as 14,000 square feet (1,300 m^{2}) of new retail space on the Madison Avenue side of the building. Apple Fifth Avenue opened in 2006. That December, the property was recapitalized again, with $1.9 billion in new senior debt. During this recapitalization, Macklowe also repurchased all of Jamestown's preferred equity stake, leaving them as sole owners. Two months later, in February 2007, Macklowe borrowed $7.6 billion in short-term debt for the acquisition of seven other buildings. The debt was to come due within twelve months. Macklowe personally pledged $1 billion, as well as interests in the GM Building and eleven other properties, as a guarantee.

==== Boston Properties ownership ====
By February 2008, the Macklowe Organization had no way to refinance the debt from the previous year. Macklowe received an extension on his loans to avoid foreclosure of the GM Building. At the same time, Macklowe put the GM Building on the market for between $3.2 and $3.5 billion. Such a sale would generate tens of millions of dollars in tax revenue for the city government and the Metropolitan Transportation Authority due to its high price. The GM Building was sold in May 2008 for an estimated $2.8 billion to a joint venture between Boston Properties, Goldman Sachs Real Estate Opportunities Fund (backed by funds from Kuwait and Qatar), and Meraas Capital (a Dubai-based real estate private equity firm). The sale served in part to pay off Macklowe's debt on the other seven buildings The sale was finalized the next month, being the largest single-asset transaction of 2008. Macklowe's ownership and subsequent sale was characterized in the 2014 book The Liar’s Ball by Vicky Ward.

Also in 2008, GM leased some space at Citigroup Center and reduced its occupancy at the GM Building to three floors. By 2012, GM had moved the last of its executives out of the building. The Early Show studio closed the same year when the show ended. FAO Schwarz occupied the GM Building's ground-level retail space until 2015, after which the space was subleased by sports clothing company Under Armour for a flagship store. Under Armour had planned to open a store in the building in 2019, but this was delayed because Apple needed some of that space for itself while the Apple Fifth Avenue store was being renovated.

In April 2017, Boston Properties negotiated a new $2.3 billion mortgage from a group of unidentified lenders, the largest received by a New York City building since a $2.7 billion loan made for Stuyvesant Town–Peter Cooper Village in late 2015. At the time, the building was appraised at $4.8 billion, making it one of the most valuable office buildings in New York City. The loan was securitized in a number of commercial mortgage-backed security transactions by multiple banks including Citigroup, JPMorgan Chase, Bank of America Merrill Lynch, Wells Fargo, UBS, and Deutsche Bank. By early 2021, Boston Properties had taken half of the retail space allocated for Under Armour for a tenant-amenity space. Under Armour itself was no longer planning to open a flagship store at the GM Building, instead planning to rent the space out. A coworking space opened in the building in 2022, and the following year, Boston Properties opened a tenant amenity area known as the Savoy Club on the second floor.

== Tenants ==
- Banco Itaú Unibanco
- ContiGroup Companies
- Eldridge Industries
- Estée Lauder Companies
- Icahn Enterprises
- J.C. Flowers & Co.
- Perella Weinberg Partners
- Weil, Gotshal & Manges
- York Capital Management

== Critical reception ==
Architecture critics disapproved of the building, including Paul Goldberger and Ada Louise Huxtable. Huxtable, writing in 1968, said that GM "has the best address in town. It has not given the city its best building". Even the first edition of the AIA Guide to New York City (1968), which normally wrote positively of International-style modernist designs, stated, "The hue and cry over the new behemoth was based, not on architecture but, rather, first on the loss of the [Savoy] hotel's elegant shopping amenities in favor of automobile salesmanship (an auto showroom is particularly galling at the spot in New York most likely to honor the pedestrian)." An unnamed architect quoted in The New York Times described the facade as "salami architecture", in that the facade "would look the same no matter where you chopped it off". Writer Brendan Gill described the building as "bruising" the sky in a 1981 exhibition, which a Times writer said "immediately makes its gracelessness quite clear". Carter B. Horsley wrote: "The GM Building actually tried to make some good urban design gestures [but] the result here fell short of the mark considerably."

When plans for the General Motors Building were announced, they were received largely negatively by the public, with many protests over the project. Glenn Fowler wrote for The New York Times that the building's construction, and the simultaneous conversion of Fifth Avenue from a two-way to a one-way route, were "momentous changes in the life of Fifth Avenue", for which "change can be measured only in decades". In a 1987 New York magazine poll of "more than 100 prominent New Yorkers", the General Motors Building was one of the ten most disliked structures in New York City. Conversely, there was also public praise for the building. William D. Smith, writing for The New York Times at the public opening in 1968, said, "It was hard to find anyone who did not like the building or the idea of an automobile showroom on Fifth Avenue."

== See also ==
- List of tallest buildings in New York City
- List of tallest buildings in the United States
