= Jornalista Roberto Marinho Building =

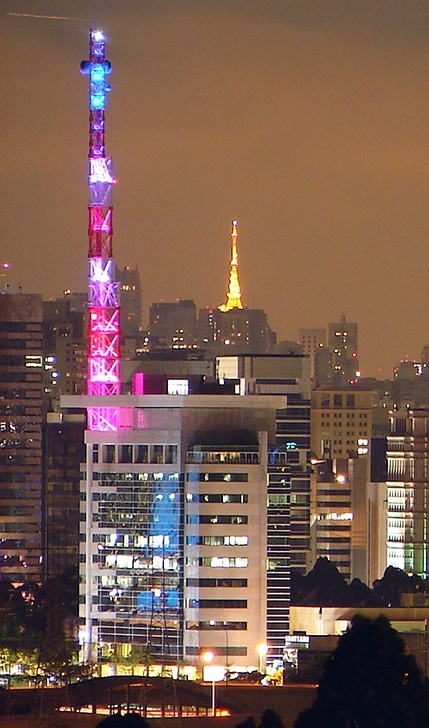

General information
- Type: Office
- Architectural style: Modernist
- Location: Rua Evandro Carlos de Andrade, 160-Brooklin Novo, São Paulo
- Construction started: 2003
- Completed: 2006

Technical details
- Floor count: 12

Design and construction
- Architect: Beatriz Krug Ometto Moreno

The Jornalista Roberto Marinho Building (Portuguese: Edifício Jornalista Roberto Marinho) in São Paulo city is the headquarters of TV Globo São Paulo. It was named in honor of the journalist Roberto Marinho, the founder of Rede Globo. The building is integrated with 17 other areas and houses the commercial department of the television network, a convention auditorium and a panoramic studio inspired by the glass cube entrance of Apple Fifth Avenue in New York.

== Background ==
The proposal presented by Rede Globo to the architecture office was the creation of a corporate building that would be integrated into the blocks destined to the department of journalism, already existing and in operation. The new building should accommodate, in addition to the company's employees, equipment, training rooms and meetings, a live broadcast link antenna, an area for the board and a private restaurant. There was also a need for space for exhibitions and events, on the ground floor, and underground parking lots.

AS

== Architectural design ==
In order to meet the extensive program, solutions were adopted such as the development of an office modulation that followed the concept of open planning, with prestressed slabs to increase the spans, reducing to the maximum the number of internal pillars. The architect José Godoy, one of the authors of the architecture project, recalls that, in the thousand-square-meter floors, the requirement was to create indoor environments that received abundant natural light.

Another condition of the project was the installation of a tower (antenna) of 80 meters for the reception and transmission of data and images of Globo TV. It should be implanted on the building with elegance, without, however, failing to meet the technical specifications. According to Álvaro Aguiar, equity manager of the company, the alternative was to execute it using the body of the building itself. In this way, two pillars contiguous to the building and an isolate form its support base.
