= Peter Walker (landscape architect) =

American public space designer

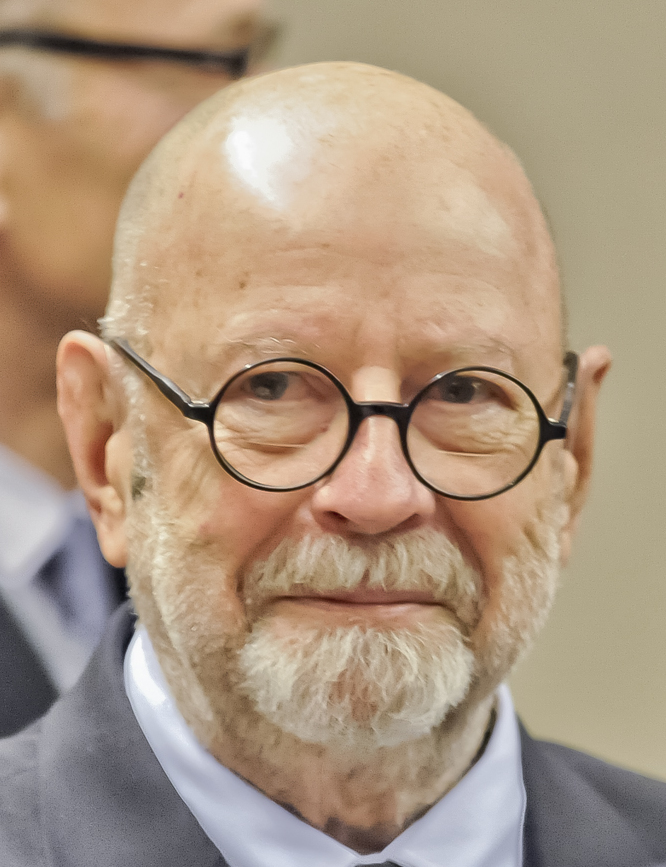
Walker in 2012

Peter Walker (born 1932 in Pasadena, California, U.S.) is an American landscape architect and the founder of PWP Landscape Architecture.

== Early life and education ==
Walker grew up in California, where he attended the University of California, Berkeley. Walker started out studying journalism but quickly changed his field and received a Bachelor of Science in Landscape Architecture in 1955. He did graduate studies at the University of Illinois, where he studied under Stanley White.

Walker attended the Harvard Graduate School of Design, where he received his master's degree in Landscape Architecture in 1957 and won the school's Jacob Weidenmann Prize that year.

== Career ==
At Harvard University, Walker had been deeply influenced by his professor, Hideo Sasaki. After graduating, he worked for Sasaki. Shortly thereafter, they both went into partnership to form Sasaki Walker Associates in 1957. Walker and Sasaki went their separate ways in 1983, and Walker entered a partnership with his then wife, landscape architect Martha Schwartz.

In the early 1990s, Walker formed Peter Walker and Partners. In a 1993 review, Walker was one of four landscape architects named as representative of the new generation. The company developed into an interdisciplinary firm that employs around thirty to forty landscape architects. The company has received many awards and co-designed the World Trade Center Memorial in New York with architect Michael Arad.

Walker designed the garden for the Nasher Sculpture Center. In 2013 he was involved in a public argument with the architect of a neighboring building, Museum Tower, because the glare from the glass was damaging the vegetation. Walker described it as "public desecration".

Peter Walker is also a co-author of Invisible Gardens, which touches on the modernist movement in the United States and the comparison of other landscapes to those in Europe. The book discusses influential landscape architects, including Sasaki.

== Awards ==
- 2004 - The ASLA Medal, the highest medal of the American Society of Landscape Architects.
- 2004 - ASLA Honor Award: Design, Nasher Sculpture Center
- 2005 - The Geoffrey Jellicoe Gold Medal from the International Federation of Landscape Architects.
- 2008 - The ASLA Landmark Award for Tanner Fountain at Harvard University, Cambridge, Massachusetts
- 2010 - Knight Management Center: Stanford GSB awarded Green Project of the Year by the Silicon Valley/San Jose Business Journal
- 2012 - The J.C. Nichols Prize Winner for Visionaries in Urban Development from the Urban Land Institute
- 2012 - Peter Walker & PWP Landscape Architecture awarded the Liberty Award by the Lower Manhattan Cultural Council.
- 2012 - The ASLA Medal Recipient.
- 2014 - The James Daniel Bybee Prize Recipient.

== Notable projects ==
=== Australia ===
- Barangaroo Headlands Park in Sydney, New South Wales
- Millennium Parklands in Sydney

=== Europe ===
- Novartis Headquarters in Basel, Switzerland
- The Sony Center in Berlin, Germany
- Munich Airport - Hotel Kempinski in Munich, Germany

=== United States ===
- National September 11 Memorial in New York, New York
- Transbay Terminal in San Francisco, California
- Jamison Square in Portland, Oregon
- Pixar Headquarters in Emeryville, California
- Constitution Gardens in Washington, D.C. (won competition for partial redesign in 2012)
- Glenstone in Potomac, Maryland
- Newport Beach Civic Center and Park in Newport Beach, California
- University of Texas at Dallas Campus in Richardson, Texas

=== Asia ===
- Jewel Changi Airport in Singapore
- Marina Bay Sands in Singapore
- Ciudad de Victoria in Bocaue, Philippines

== Publications ==
=== Books ===
- Walker, Peter, and Leah Levy. Peter Walker: Minimalist Gardens. Washington, DC: Spacemaker, 1997. Print.
- Invisible Gardens: The Search for Modernism in the American Landscape. Walker, Peter, and Melanie Simo. Cambridge, Massachusetts: MIT-Press, 1998. Print.Cambridge, Massachusetts: MIT-Press, 1998.
- Peter Walker and Partners: Defining the Craft. Walker, Peter. San Rafael, CA: ORO Editions, 2005. Print.

== Sources ==
- Mozingo, Louise A. (2011), Pastoral Capitalism: A History of Suburban Corporate Landscapes, Massachusetts Institute of Technology, ISBN 978-0-262-01543-1
- Treib, Marc (1993), Modern Landscape Architecture: A Critical Review, Mit Press, ISBN 978-0-262-70051-1
