= John Burns (businessman) =

British businessman

- Born: John David Burns; May 1944 (age 81); UK
- Occupations: CEO of Derwent London, property developer, surveyor
- Spouse: Married
- Children: 2
- Relatives: Richard Livingstone (former son-in-law)

John David Burns CBE (born May 1944) is a British chartered surveyor and property developer, founder and CEO of the FTSE 250-listed Derwent London.

== Early life ==
John David Burns was born in May 1944. According to Burns, he entered estate agency on the advice of his mother, "My mother said it was a very gentlemanly business, which it was at the time and still is today, to a degree." He trained as a chartered surveyor.

== Career ==
In 1961, Burns joined Hillier Parker as a property negotiator. In 1965, he became a partner in the estate agency Barnet Baker. In 1974, he became a senior partner in the estate agency Pilcher Hershman.

In 1984, Burns was looking for a shell company to manage his property interests and chose the Derwent Valley Light Railway Company, which was then the owner of a few disused railway stations and valued at £1.5m. This became Derwent London, with Burns as its CEO.

== Personal life ==
Burns is married with two grown-up children. In 1997, his daughter Claire married the billionaire property developer Richard Livingstone. They later divorced.
