= Apple Fifth Avenue =

Apple Store in Midtown Manhattan, New York City

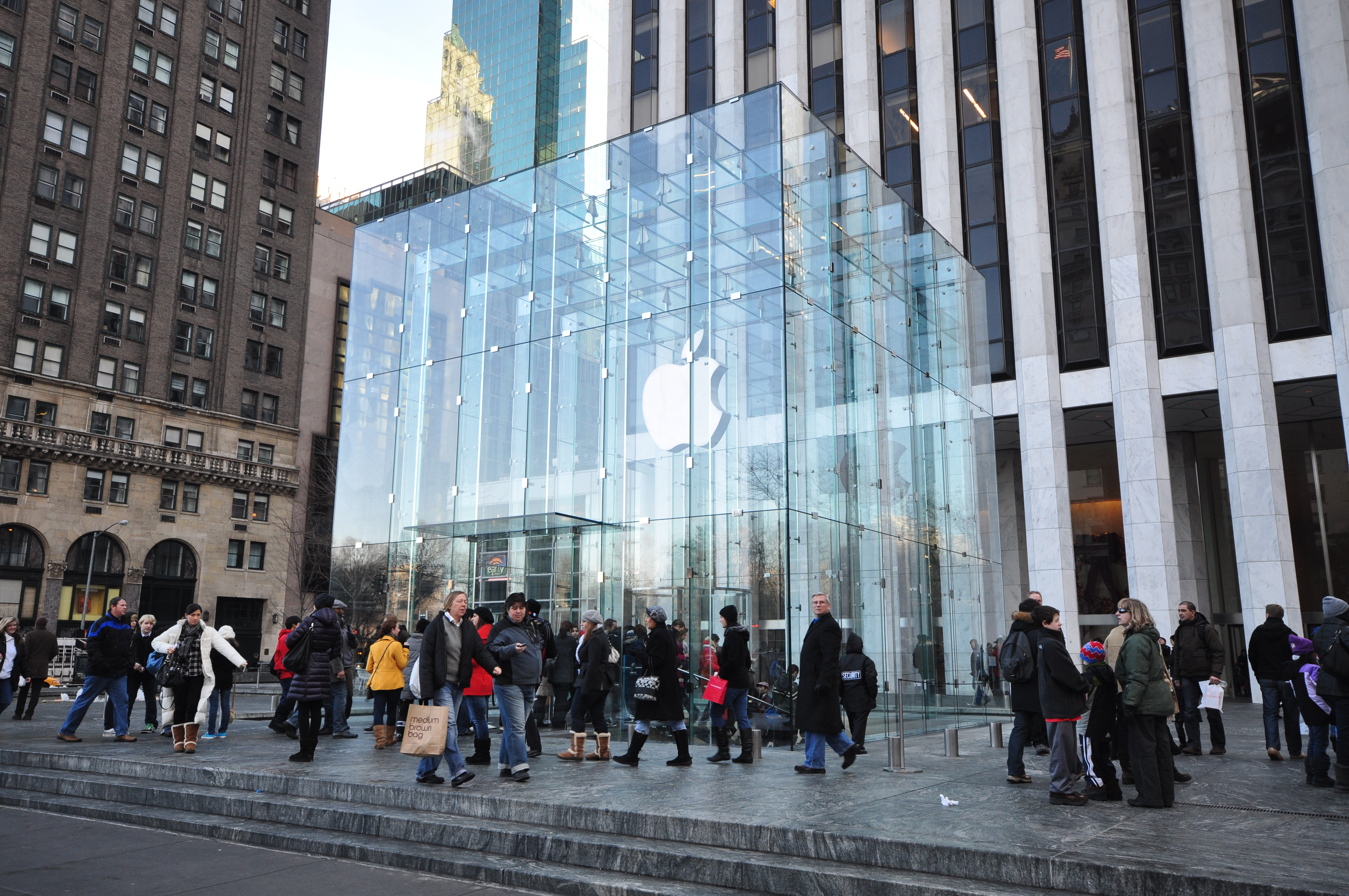
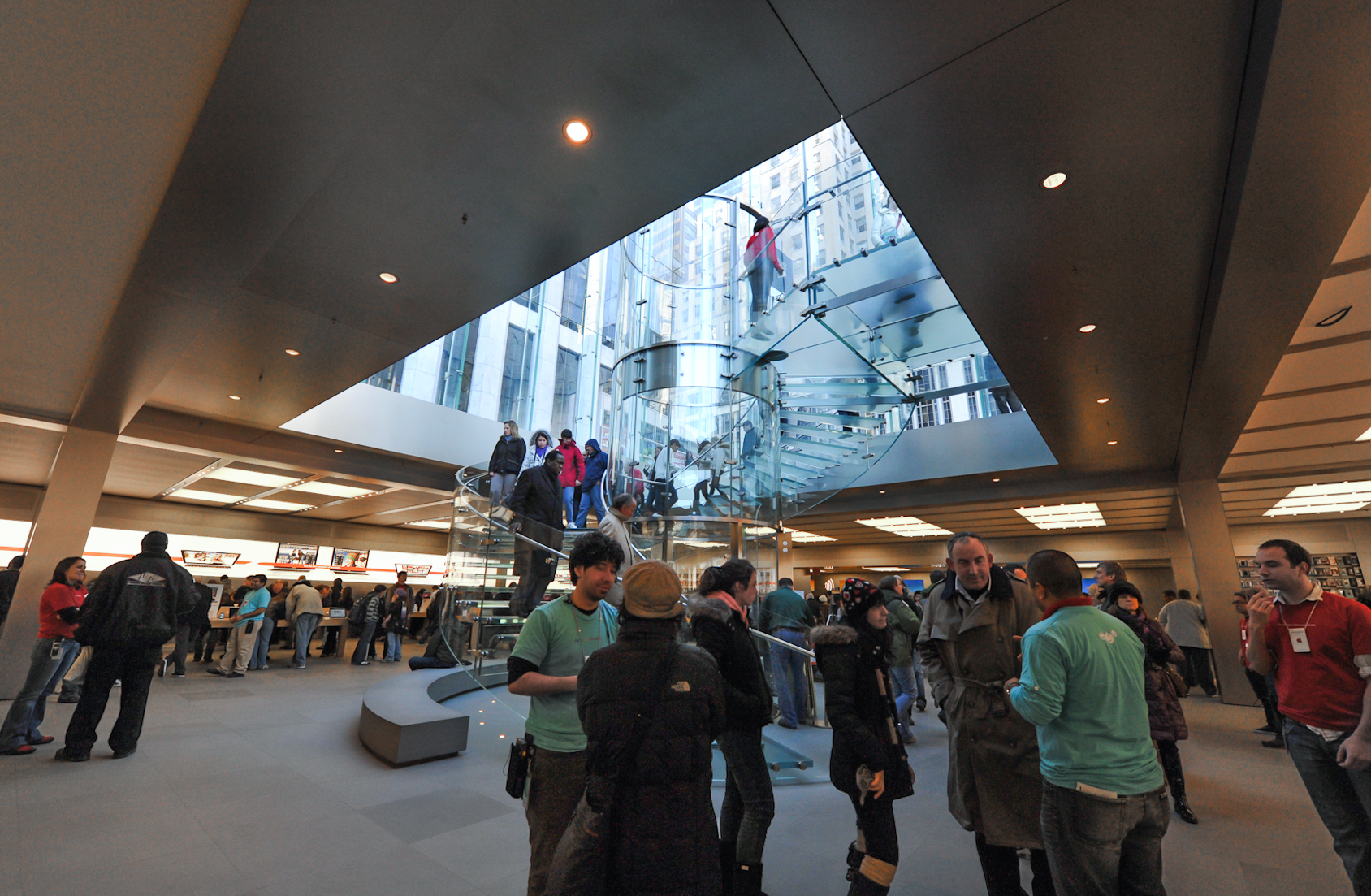
- Exterior and interior as originally built

General information
- Type: Electronics store
- Location: 767 Fifth Avenue, Manhattan, New York City
- Coordinates: 40.76383°N 73.97298°W
- Current tenants: Apple Inc.
- Opened: May 19, 2006
- Renovated: 2011, 2017–2019
- Renovation cost: $2 million (2017–19)
- Landlord: BXP, Inc.

Design and construction
- Architect: Bohlin Cywinski Jackson

Renovating team
- Architect: Foster + Partners
- Other designers: Jony Ive

Other information
- Public transit: Subway: at 59th Street; Bus: M1, M2, M3, M4, M5, BxM7, Q32

Website
- apple.com/retail/fifthavenue

Apple Fifth Avenue is an Apple Store, a retail location of Apple, in Midtown Manhattan, New York City, United States. It is in the luxury shopping district of Fifth Avenue between 59th and 60th Streets, and opposite Manhattan's Grand Army Plaza. The store is considered one of several Apple flagship locations, and the pre-eminent store for Apple in New York City.

The store is on and beneath a public plaza by the General Motors Building, built in 1968. Its exposed exterior is a transparent 32 ft (9.8 m) cube in the middle of the plaza. The plaza is partly lined with benches and trees. The substantive interior, below ground, features a reflective steel spiral staircase and elevator, wooden tables with Apple products, and rooms and areas for specific Apple products.

Apple Fifth Avenue was first constructed in 2006 and designed by Bohlin Cywinski Jackson. It was renovated in 2011 to simplify the façade. From 2017 to 2019, the store was rebuilt with about double the retail space to a more modern design by Foster + Partners.

== Design ==
Apple Fifth Avenue is on Fifth Avenue between 58th and 59th Streets, across from the Plaza Hotel. The store is located on and beneath a public plaza built for the General Motors Building, built in 1968. The site is adjacent to the southeast corner of Central Park, opposite Manhattan's Grand Army Plaza.

The current design is a collaboration between Foster + Partners and Apple's chief design officer Jony Ive, while the original structure was designed by Bohlin Cywinski Jackson, led by Peter Bohlin. Foster + Partners also designed Apple's Miami, Chicago, Macau, and Tokyo stores, while Bohlin Cywinski Jackson was responsible for the designs of many Apple stores, including an earlier store in the SoHo neighborhood.

=== Cube entrance ===
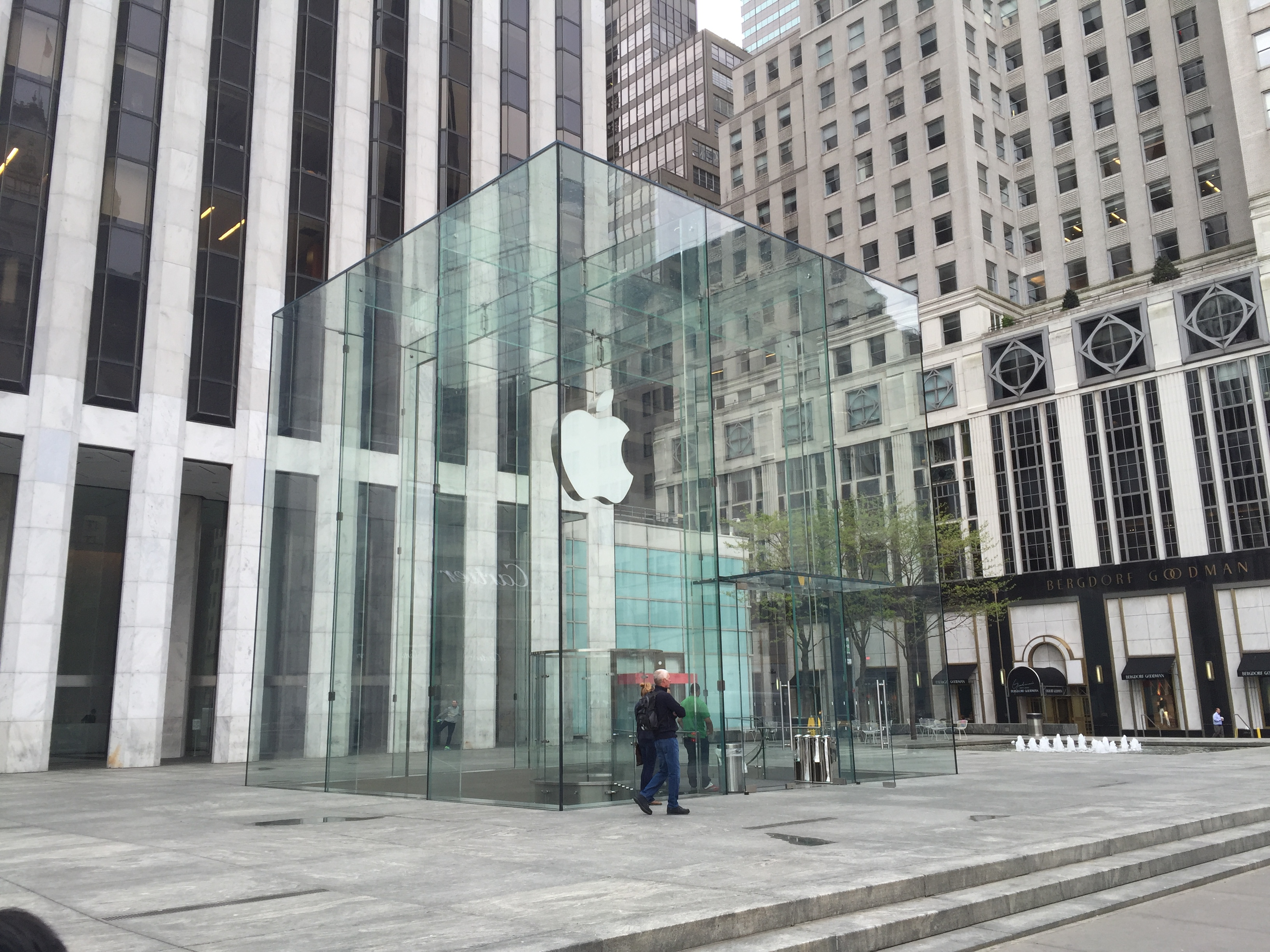
The 15-panel cube created in 2011

The store has a glass cube as its entranceway, measuring 32 ft (9.8 m) on each side, and with a suspended Apple logo inside. The entranceway originally featured a glass spiral staircase wrapped around a cylindrical glass elevator. At the time, architectural glass was rapidly becoming stronger, and so multi-ply glass was used for nearly the entire structure, with only small stainless steel bolts tying the glass panels together.

The cube was designed to motivate people to enter the store, creating a "ceremony of descent", a grand entrance to ennoble visitors rather than put people off entering the basement store. The glass cube was inspired by and likened to the Louvre Pyramid in a 2005 New York Times article; the skyscraper's owner had solicited ideas from the pyramid's architect, I. M. Pei. The glass cube features 15 large panels of glass, unchanged during the 2017–19 renovation. A 2011 renovation streamlined the design from the original 90 panels that made up the structure, and made the glass panels fit together seamlessly.

The cube entrance has no signage save for a large illuminated Apple logo, a feature typical of Apple Stores, and recalling Tiffany & Co.'s fifth flagship building, which only displayed its iconic Atlas statue to signify the store's presence.

=== Plaza ===
The General Motors Building plaza as originally built

The Apple Store sits around and beneath a public plaza, reconstructed during Apple's 2017–19 renovation. The plaza features 62 circular frosted skylights lying flush with the plaza's stone floors. It also includes 18 "sky lenses" which act as seats and public art. The lenses are ocular reflective steel shells with glass tops that provide a view down into the store. Nine sky lenses are placed on either side of the store entrance, each in three rows of three.

The plaza also features symmetrical sets of honey locust trees, planted on the north and south ends of the plaza, amid benches and low-lying water fountains. Secondary entrances feature stone staircases descending from the plaza into the store below, surrounded by stone planters at street level. The secondary entrances were added during the 2017–19 renovation after the store's popularity had led to severe congestion in the original design.

The space was first built as a 12-foot-deep sunken plaza for the General Motors Building, an area by the 1990s seen as an "underused, unattractive desolate place" with green artificial turf and mostly empty retail space. It was raised to street level around 1999, a year after Donald Trump purchased the building and plaza. His renovation involved creating slightly elevated groves of trees on its north and south ends and installing fountains, benches, and a retail pavilion. The plaza was again reconstructed around 2005 during the store's construction. The reconstruction involved leveling out the plaza even further and installing low L-shaped parapets on the four corners of the plaza, framing its sides. Shallow decorative pools were installed on either end of the cube, surrounded by tables, chairs, planters, and a few honey locust trees.

=== Interior ===
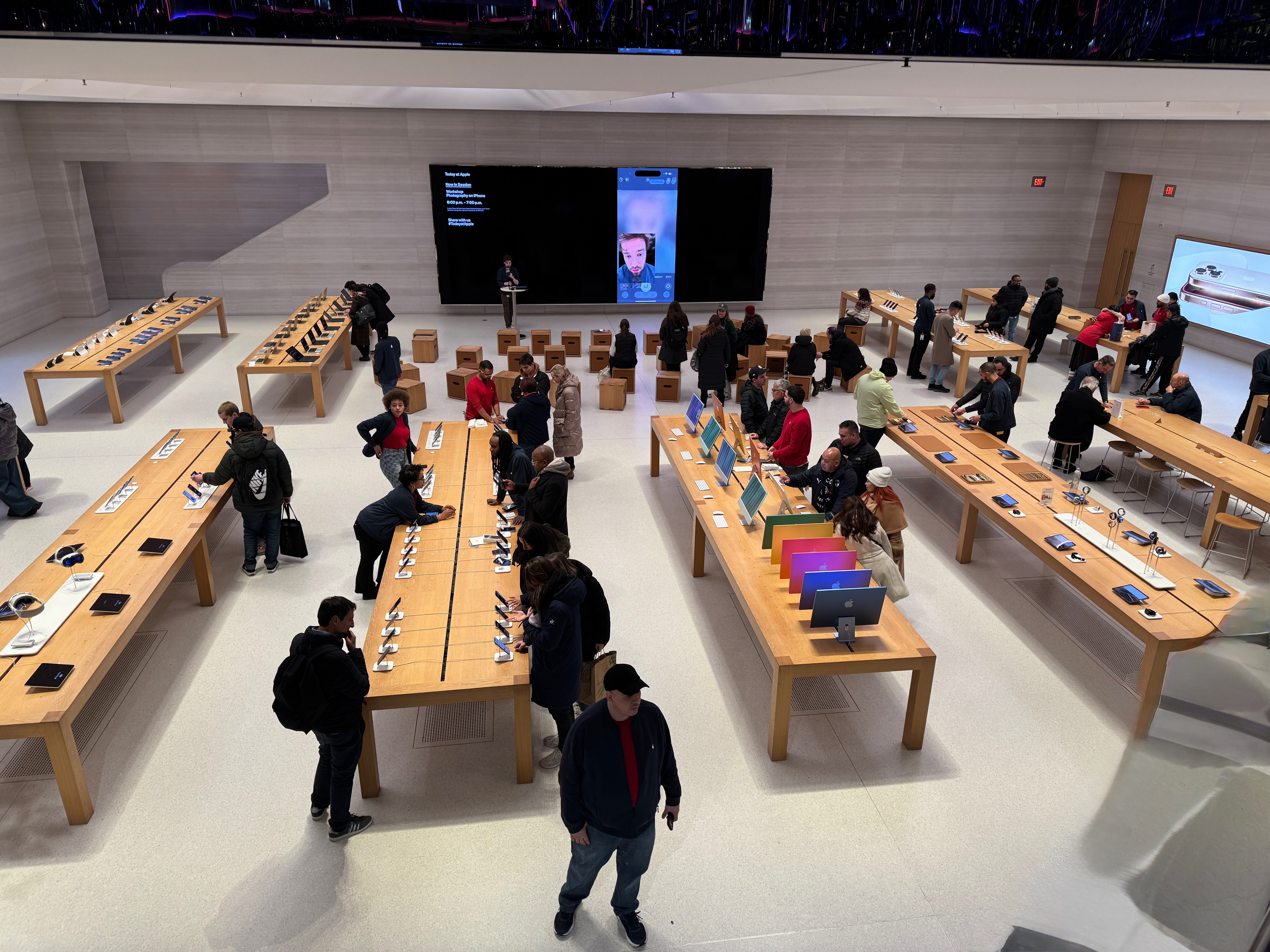
Part of the store interior, 2024

At first opening, the interior was organized around different uses of Apple's technology, with areas themed for creating podcasts and blogs, editing digital media, and organizing music.

Since the store's 2017–19 renovation, it has about double the interior space and significantly higher ceilings. The renovation also added the two secondary entrances and replaced the original glass staircase with one made of stainless steel.

The interior walls are clad in pale gray Italian Castagna stone with subtle stripes and rounded corners. Its floors are made of off-white terrazzo.

The store predominantly has one large room lined with display shelving. The space also features wooden tables and matching storage units. The tables are double the length of standard Apple Store tables, the second store to include them. The store has two rows of trees; the trees' circular planters function as benches, upholstered with a caramel-colored fabric atop a white base. The store's Genius Grove has a backdrop of a large plant wall. It spans the length of the store, doubled from its original size during the renovation.

The main salesroom also features a large area for classes and presentations at its north end. A large television screen is installed on the north wall, surrounded by wooden seats.

The ceiling features 80 skylights arranged in a grid across the ceiling, surrounded by white LEDs which automatically adjust their white balance from blueish white to golden to match the hue of natural light coming in each day. The skylights' lightwells are identical, round, and surrounded by a knitted fabric creating a tent-like effect to the ceiling.

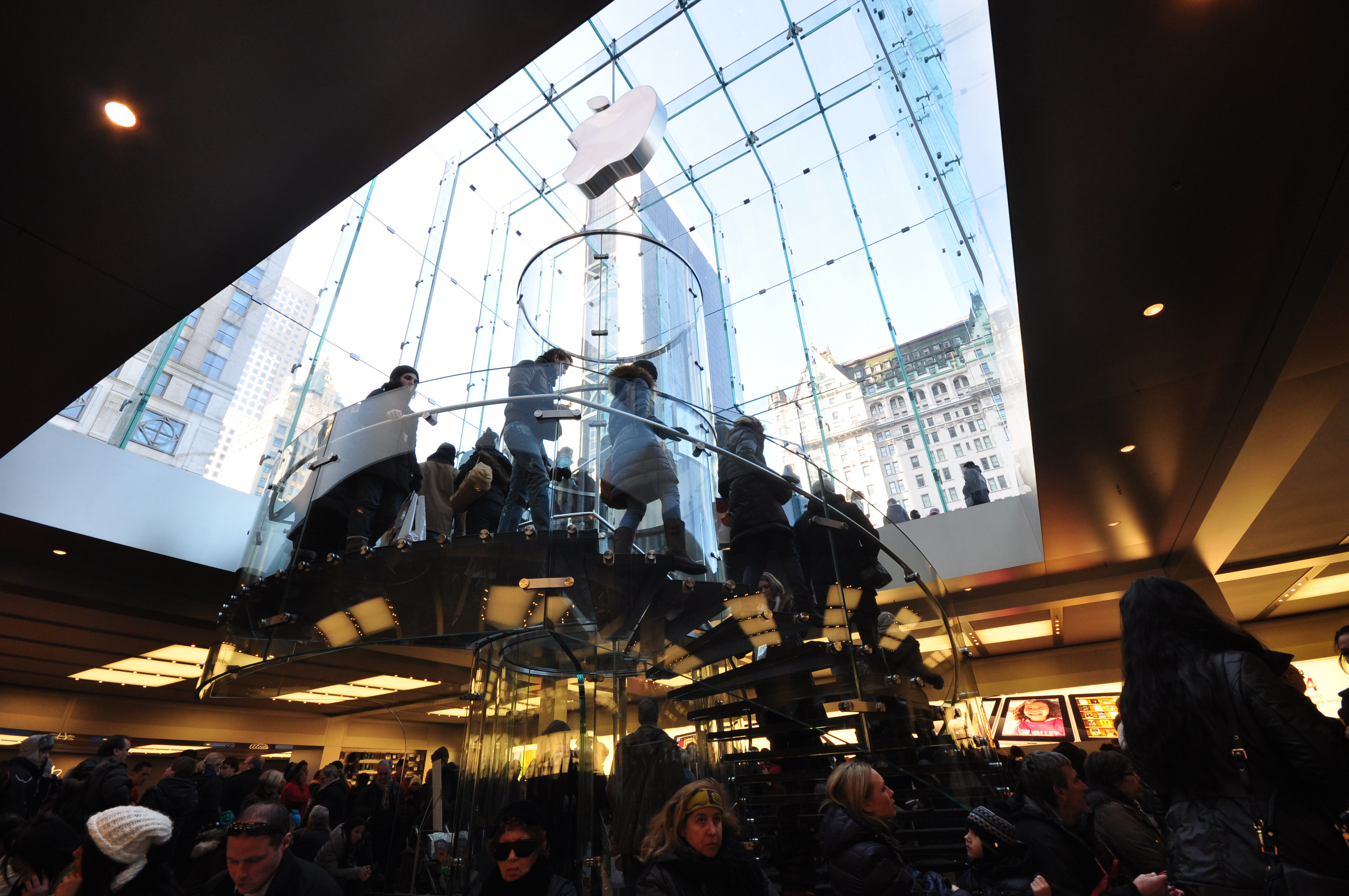
The original glass staircase below the Fifth Avenue entrance

The store's central spiral staircase, leading down into the store from the street-level cube entrance, was redesigned in 2017–19. The original staircase was predominantly made of glass. The present staircase has a mirrored stainless steel cylinder and steps, with short glass walls around the steps. The central cylinder contains an elevator with a glass bottom and top. Its exterior supports 43 cantilevering steps, designed with Bézier curves, evoking the shape of Apple products. The store's secondary staircases are at the north and south ends of the store, with sculpted entries from within the store.

Other rooms in the store include two board rooms for private events and meetings, as well as an "Experience Room" to show how Apple products and services work together. The room has leather benches, residential furniture, and fixtures. Apple HomePods are placed to showcase Apple Music in this quieter part of the store. The Experience Room, added in the 2017–19 renovation, is the second in the U.S. and third in the world.

== Operation ==
The store operates with about 900 employees, most of whom are bilingual; the team collectively speaks about 36 languages. The store originally had 300 employees, with 5,000 initial applications. At its opening, about half were assigned to provide free assistance on using Apple products. All of the staff were salaried, with no sales commissions.

The store is always open to customers, with no hours or days closed, an acknowledgement of New York City's late-night street life in place since its opening. It is the only Apple Store that is open 24/7.

The store includes an "Apple Watch Studio", a replication of the company's online tool to customize smart watches. The area allows customers to choose watch size, case material, and watch bands to purchase. The store also includes a room for testing the company's HomePod products.

== History ==
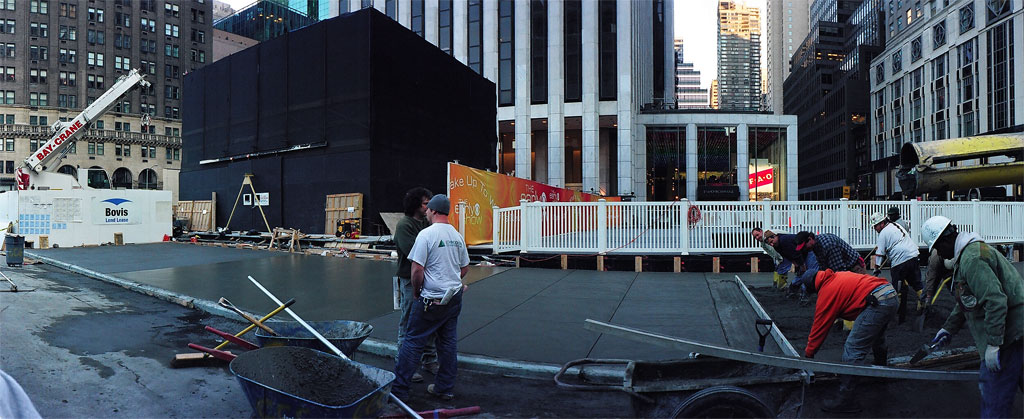
Initial construction, 2005

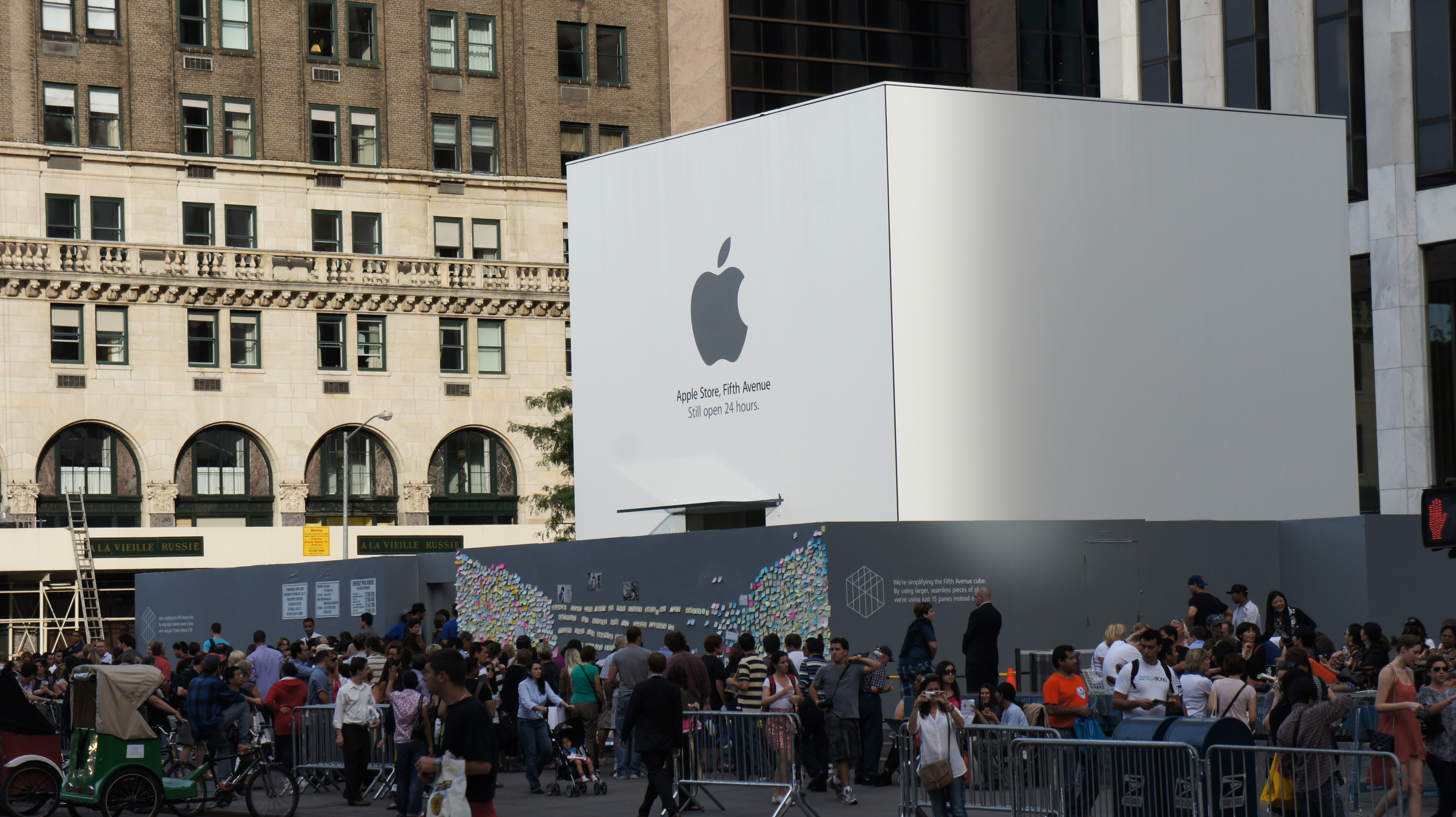
The store site in 2011, amid renovation and tributes to Steve Jobs

The plaza and neighboring General Motors Building occupy a site which has seen numerous uses. The Savoy Hotel opened there in 1890, and which was replaced by the Savoy-Plaza Hotel in 1927. The Savoy-Plaza was demolished in 1963 to build the General Motors Building and its plaza, completed in 1968.

Harry Macklowe purchased the General Motors Building in 2003. One of his first plans to modify his property was to monetize its large plaza on Fifth Avenue. Architects and industry insiders had called it the "problematic plaza", considering it was a large unused space with a valuable street presence, and with an unused basement. Macklowe viewed the space as ideal for a store for the up-and-coming Apple Inc., and repeatedly brought his ideas up to Apple's vice president in charge of real estate until he was invited to meet with Apple CEO Steve Jobs in November 2003. The meeting established the idea for a flagship store open 24/7 at the space; it was attended by several architects and designers, including from Bohlin Cywinski Jackson, who designed the Soho Apple Store. Jobs pitched the idea of a 40-ft. glass cube at the center of the site, while Macklowe proposed a glass pavilion close to the street; both ideas ended up merging.

Macklowe thought Jobs' proposed 40-foot (12 m) cube was too large for the site, violating zoning restrictions and obscuring and not harmonizing with the scale of the GM Building. With thoughts that he wouldn't convince Jobs without visual proof, he had a mockup of the 40-ft. cube constructed in the late night on the plaza. Apple executives viewed the structure at 2 a.m. and agreed the cube was too large. Macklowe then had the structure dismantled, revealing a 30-ft. cube within, one that the Apple executives approved of. The store was then developed in secret, and a prototype model was quietly built in a warehouse near the Apple Campus in Cupertino, California.

The store opened on May 19, 2006, as Apple's 147th store. It immediately drew lines of customers; in its first year the store averaged sales of $1 million per day. Macklowe's real estate lawyer expressed regret that they had agreed to a "horrendously low" stop on Apple's percentage rent, as revenue far exceeded initial expectations.

In June 2011, Apple began a 5-month renovation of the store, with a cost of $6.7 million. The renovation simplified the store's glass cube entranceway, reducing its structure from 90 panels of glass to 15. The renovation also included minor changes to the surrounding plaza.

From 2017 to 2019, the store was closed and reconstructed. Apple moved into a temporary space within the GM Building during the renovation, and kept the 24/7/365 operating hours. The space, formerly occupied by FAO Schwarz, was considered for an annex to the Apple Store around 2016, though the rent price was an issue. The renovation involved demolishing the former store, starting anew under the plans of Foster + Partners. The new plans nearly doubled the store's space, and substantially raised its ceiling by digging deeper into the ground. In early September 2019, for a few weeks before the store was set to reopen, the new exterior was revealed. It had a temporary rainbow iridescence, created by a film wrap around the glass cube. The store reopened on September 20, 2019, coinciding with the release of iPhone 11 series phones and the Apple Watch Series 5.

== Reception and legacy ==
At the store's opening, the New York Times reported on the flagship, saying it "will burnish the company's reputation for clever design". The newspaper, however, called many of its functions "costly indulgences", where almost half of its staff were there to provide free help on how to use Apple products, and crowds would use its internet-connected display computers and iPods to check email, browse webpages, or listen to music. When the store reopened in 2019, an author for Architectural Digest wrote: "For many, it’s now impossible to imagine the southeast corner of Central Park without it."

The store is one of the most photographed landmarks in New York City. A 2009 Cornell University study mapping out geotagged photographs worldwide indicated the store was the fifth-most geotagged site in New York City and 28th-most worldwide, being geotagged in more photographs than even the Statue of Liberty was.

The store is favorably viewed by the public. The American Institute of Architects' 2007 survey List of America's Favorite Architecture ranked Apple Fifth Avenue as the 53rd-best building in the United States. In the same survey, respondents ranked it their 15th favorite in the city and state.

The store design inspired attributes of later Apple stores, including Apple Walnut Street in Philadelphia and Apple Upper West Side in New York City, both also designed by Bohlin Cywinski Jackson.
