= Bernard Cywinski =

American architect and teacher

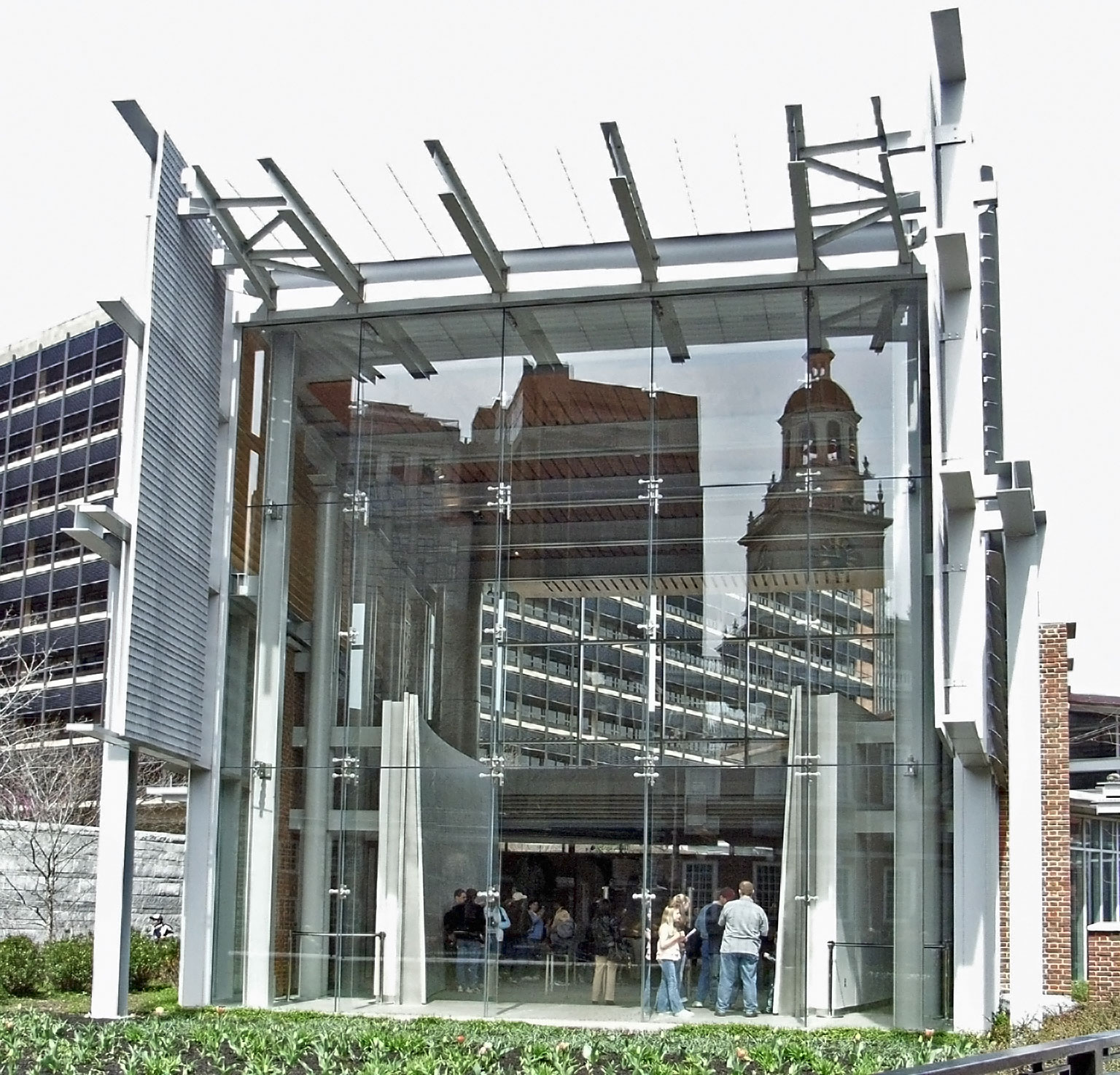
An exterior view of Cywinski's Liberty Bell Center. Cywinski designed the large white marble structures seen in the interior to protect the Liberty Bell.

Bernard J. Cywinski FAIA (March 29, 1940 – March 2, 2011) was an American architect and teacher, based in Philadelphia, Pennsylvania. His works include the Liberty Bell Center at Independence National Historical Park and the G. Wayne Clough Undergraduate Learning Commons at the Georgia Institute of Technology. He was a founding partner and a principal of the architectural firm, Bohlin Cywinski Jackson of Philadelphia.

Cywinski was raised in Trenton, New Jersey. He graduated from Columbia College at Columbia University and the Columbia Graduate School of Architecture, Planning and Preservation.

In 1979, he and his partner, John F. Larkin, merged their architectural firm, Larkin Cywinski, with that of Peter Bohlin and Richard Powell, which was based in Wilkes-Barre, Pennsylvania. The merged company would be called Bohlin Powell Larkin Cywinski, later Bohlin Cywinski Jackson. According to The Philadelphia Inquirer, Cywinski and Bohlin had a mutual interest in sketching, though Cywinski used a mechanical pencil while Bohlin used a traditional pencil. Within the firm, Cywinski concentrated largely on projects and affairs at the firm's Philadelphia headquarters, while Bohlin designed projects farther from the city. In 1994, the American Institute of Architects awarded both Cywinski and Bohlin the Firm Award for their work. The firm grew to include five offices located in Wilkes-Barre, Philadelphia, Pittsburgh, Seattle, and San Francisco.

Cywinski was a co-author of the master plan for the redesign of Independence Mall in the 1990s, and was the chief architect and designer of the Liberty Bell Center, which opened in 2003.

He suffered from cancer for more than ten years. His last sketches were of a series of new, proposed light poles, which he hoped would help to brand parts of the Avenue of the Arts on Broad Street in Philadelphia. The sculptural lighting prototypes were first tested on March 2, 2011. Cywinski died the same day, March 2, at the age of 70. He was survived by his wife, Nancy Oklesson Cywinski.
