= Peter Bohlin =

American architect

Peter Q. Bohlin
- Born: March 27, 1937 (age 89); New York City
- Occupation: Architect
- Awards: AIA Gold Medal (2010) Senior Fellow of the Design Futures Council (2010); AIA Cote Top Ten Green Project Award (2008); AIA Pennsylvania Medal of Distinction (2008); RPI confers Honorary Doctoral Degree (2006); RPI Alumni Key Award (2004) RPI Thomas W. Phelan Fellows Award (1994)
- Buildings: Pixar Animation Studios: Emeryville, California; Adobe Systems: San Francisco, California; The Barn at Fallingwater, for the Western Pennsylvania Conservancy; Liberty Bell Center: Philadelphia, Pennsylvania; Seattle City Hall: Seattle, Washington
- Projects: Apple Store

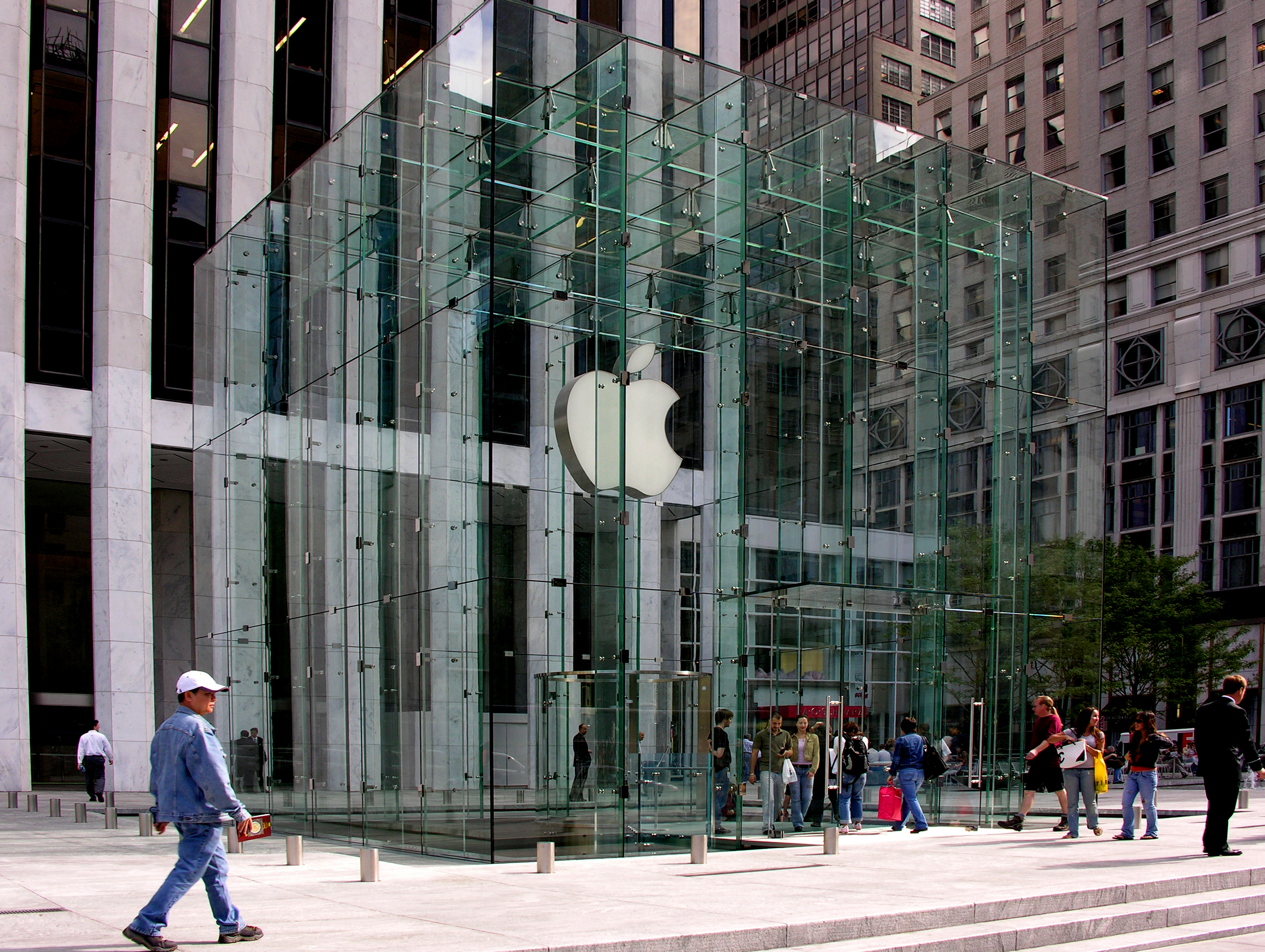
The entrance to Apple Fifth Avenue in New York City is a glass cube, housing a cylindrical glass elevator and a glass spiral staircase to the underground store.

Peter Q. Bohlin (born 1937 in New York City, United States) is an American architect and the winner of the 2010 Gold Medal of the American Institute of Architects. He is a Fellow of the American Institute of Architects (FAIA) and a founding principal of Bohlin Cywinski Jackson, established originally in 1965 as Bohlin and Powell in Wilkes-Barre, Pennsylvania.

Bohlin Cywinski Jackson has six offices in Wilkes-Barre, Pittsburgh, Philadelphia, Seattle, and San Francisco. In 1994, Bohlin Cywinski Jackson was honored with the Firm Award presented by the American Institute of Architects. Peter Bohlin has been a guest design critic and a visiting professor at architecture schools. He received his Bachelor of Architecture from Rensselaer Polytechnic Institute in 1958 and his Master of Architecture degree from Cranbrook Academy of Art. He was inducted into RPI's Alumni Hall of Fame in 2011.

== Selected projects ==
- Copperhill Mountain Lodge: Åre, Sweden
- Grand Teton National Park Discovery and Visitors Center: Jackson, Wyoming
- Apple Store: Apple Fifth Avenue
- Apple Store: SoHo
- Apple Store: Upper West Side
- Apple Store: 14th Street
- Apple Store: Boylston Street
- Apple Store: Regent Street, London
- Apple Store: Carrousel du Louvre, Paris
- Apple Store: Sydney, Australia
- Apple Store: Ginza, Japan
- Apple Store: Shinsaibashi, Japan
- Apple Store: San Francisco
- Apple Store: Chestnut Street
- Apple Store: Scottsdale, Arizona
- Apple Store: North Michigan Avenue
- Eggers Hall, Maxwell School of Citizenship and Public Affairs, Syracuse, NY
- The William J. Nealon Federal Building and Courthouse: Scranton, Pennsylvania
- The Pocono Environmental Education Center: Dingmans Ferry, Pennsylvania
- Seattle City Hall: Seattle, Washington
- University of California, Santa Cruz Digital Arts Facility: Santa Cruz, California
- Mills College, Lorry I. Lokey Graduate School of Business: Oakland, California
- Pixar Animation Studios & Headquarters: Emeryville, California
- Adobe Systems: San Francisco, California
- Liberty Bell Center: Philadelphia, Pennsylvania
- The Barn at Fallingwater, for the Western Pennsylvania Conservancy
- Ballard Library & Neighborhood Service Center: Ballard, Seattle
- Williams College, North & South Academic Buildings: Williamstown, Massachusetts
- Forest House: Connecticut
- The Ledge House: Maryland
- Creekside House: California
- Umerani Residence: California
- House at the Shawangunks: New York
- Combs Point Residence: New York
- Envelope House: Washington
- Gosline House: Washington
- Woodway Residence: Washington
- Lily Lake Residence: Pennsylvania
- House in the Blue Mountains: Pennsylvania
- House in the Endless Mountains: Pennsylvania
- Waverly: Pennsylvania
- Point House: Montana
- House on Lake Tahoe: Nevada
- Farrar Residence: Utah
- Thomas M. Siebel Center for Computer Science, University of Illinois
- Princeton Barn: New Jersey

== Awards and honors ==
- 2010 AIA Gold Medal 66th Award Medalist
- 2010 named a Senior Fellow of the Design Futures Council.
- Nine American Institute of Architects Honor Awards
- 2008 AIA COTE Top Ten Green Project Award for Pocono Environmental Education Center
- 2008 American Institute of Architects Pennsylvania Medal of Distinction
- 2006 Rensselaer Polytechnic Institute Confers Honorary Doctoral Degree
- 2004 Rensselaer Polytechnic Institute Alumni Key Award
- 1994 Rensselaer Polytechnic Institute Thomas W. Phelan Fellows Award

== Books ==
- Bohlin Cywinski Jackson: The Nature of Circumstance, 2010 ISBN 978-0-8478-3293-4
- Grand Teton: A National Park Building, 2009 ISBN 978-0-9814628-1-3
- Farrar: Bohlin Cywinski Jackson, 2007 ISBN 978-0-9774672-7-3 (one of their residential projects)
- Liberty Bell Center: Bohlin Cywinski Jackson, 2006 ISBN 978-0-9746800-4-0
- Arcadian Architecture: Bohlin Cywinski Jackson: 12 Houses, 2005 ISBN 978-0-8478-2696-4
- Ledge House: Bohlin Cywinski Jackson, 1999 ISBN 978-1-56496-521-9
- The Architecture of Bohlin Cywinski Jackson, 1994 ISBN 978-1-56496-112-9
