= Bohlin Cywinski Jackson =

American architectural practice

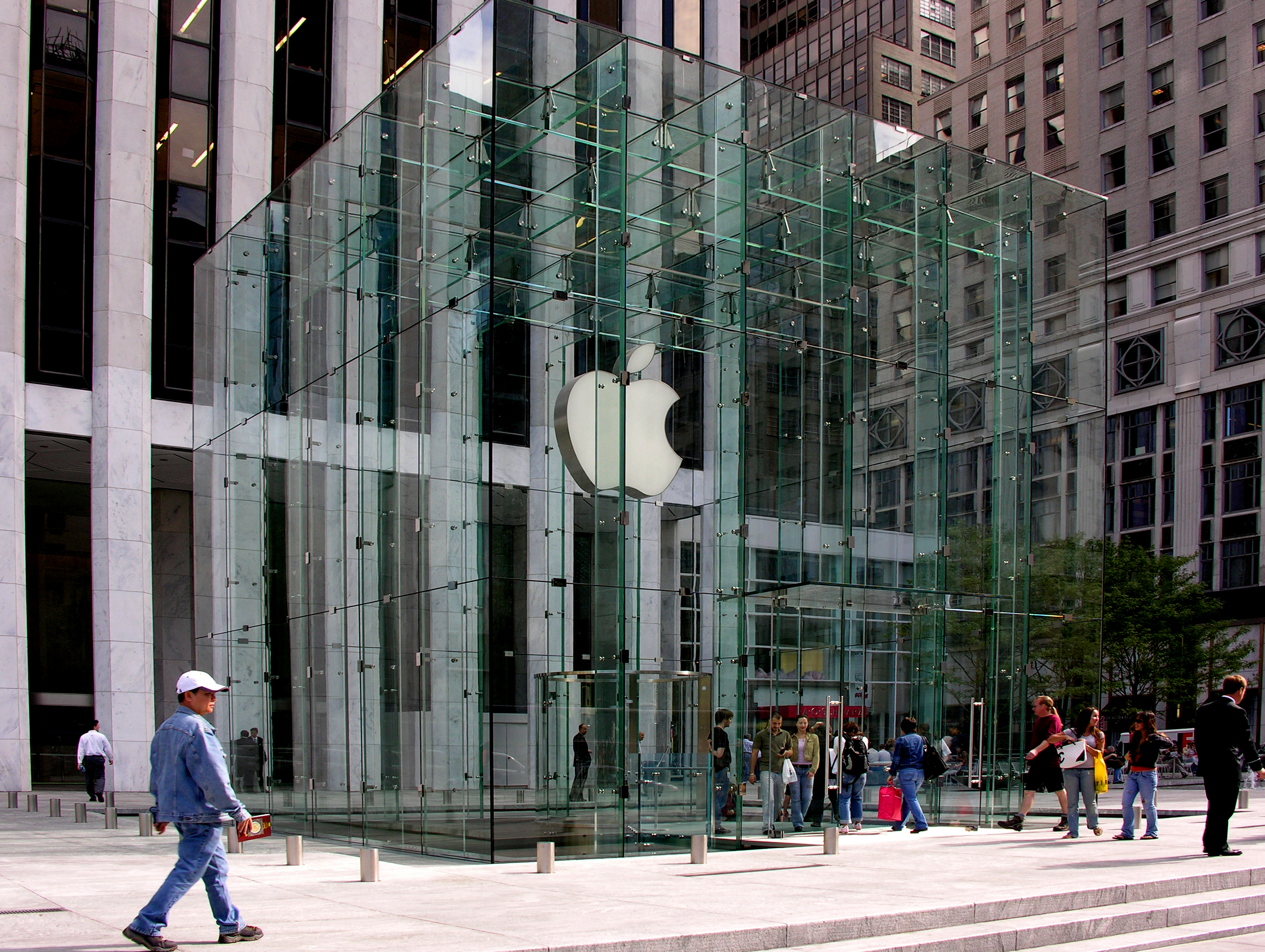
The entrance to Apple Fifth Avenue in New York City is a glass cube, housing a cylindrical glass elevator and a glass spiral staircase to the underground store.

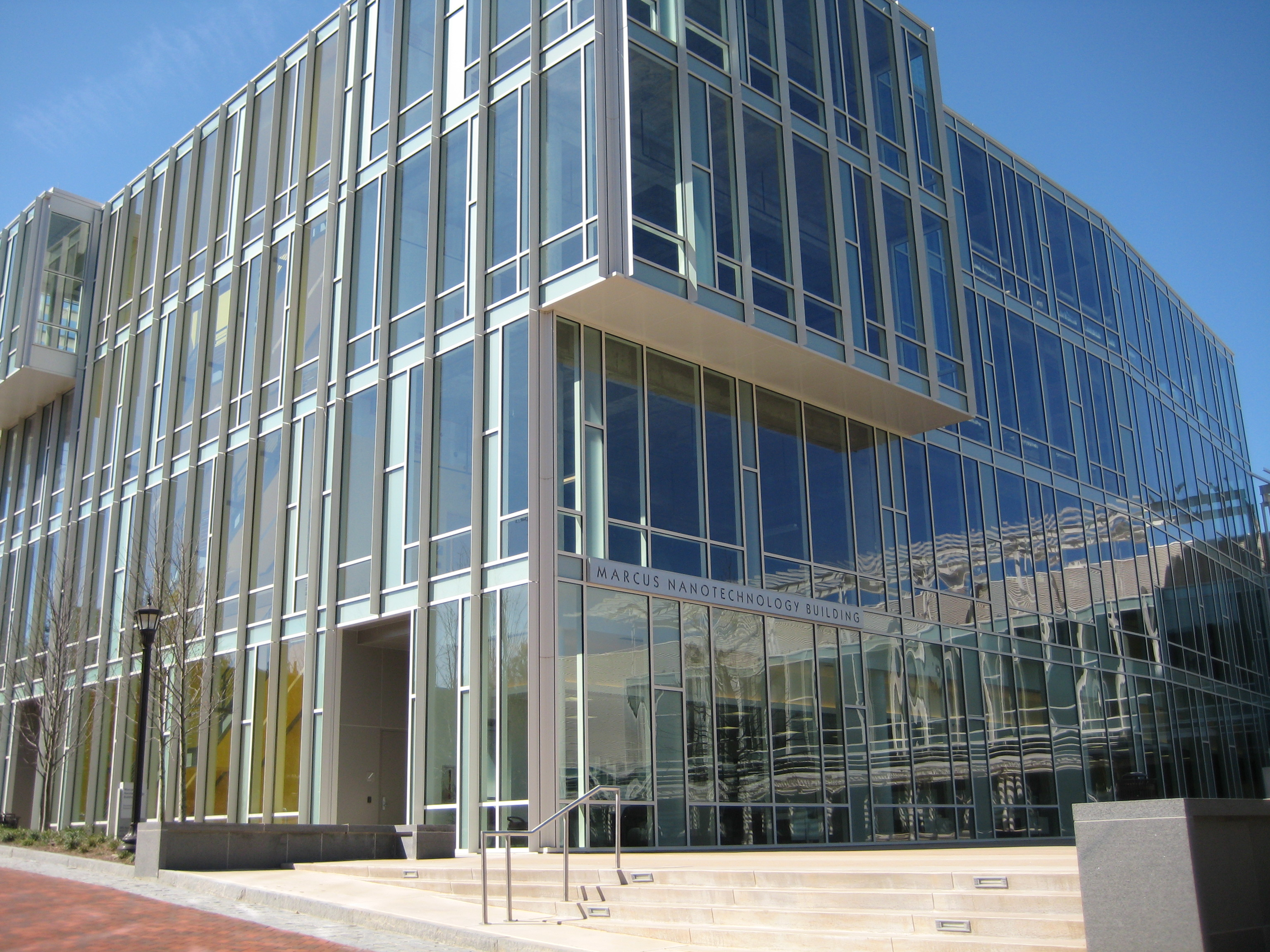
Georgia Institute of Technology Marcus Nanotechnology Research Center high technology research lab and clean room.

Bohlin Cywinski Jackson is a United States–based architectural practice that was founded as Bohlin & Powell in 1965 in Wilkes-Barre, Pennsylvania by Peter Bohlin and Richard Powell. Briefly known as Bohlin Powell Brown, with offices in Wilkes-Barre and Pittsburgh, the firm merged with John F. Larkin and Bernard Cywinski's Philadelphia-based architectural practice, Larkin Cywinski, in 1979. It is recognized for its distinguished portfolio of residential, university, commercial, cultural and government projects.

== Design ==
Bohlin Cywinski Jackson is known for emphasizing a strong relationship between buildings and their physical surroundings. They were an early advocate of sustainable design and subsequently received national awards from the American Institute of Architects Committee on the Environment. Their buildings include the Liberty Bell Center, Apple Fifth Avenue in New York City, Seattle City Hall and the Discovery and Visitor Center at Grand Teton National Park.

== Architects ==
Current principal architects of the firm include Raymond Calabro, Thomas Kirk, David Miller and Daniel Lee.

== History ==
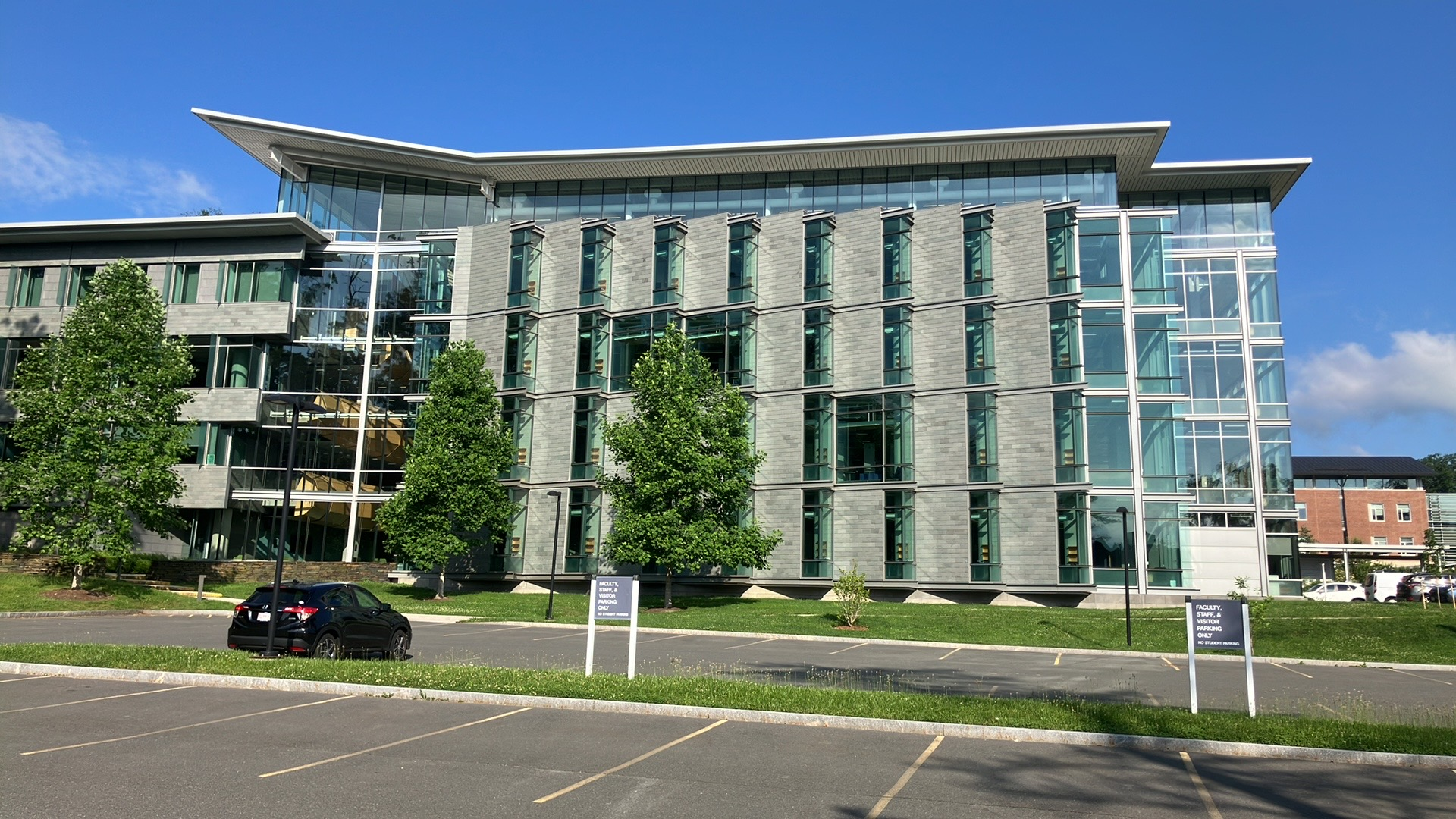
Bohlin Cywinski Jackson designed the Sawyer Library at Williams College which won the Excellence in Architecture Honor Award for Adaptive Reuse of the original red brick Georgian Revival Stetson Hall. This picture shows the modern east side of the building.

The modern firm was created in 1979 through the merger of the firm of Philadelphia-based architects John F. Larkin and Bernard Cywinski and that of Peter Bohlin, whose architectural firm was based in Wilkes-Barre, Pennsylvania, at the time. According to The Philadelphia Inquirer, Bohlin and Cywinski had been drawn together through a shared interest in sketching . Bernard Cywinski died in 2011, at the age of 70.

== Awards ==
In 1994, the practice received the American Institute of Architects Firm Award, which recognizes the design work of an entire firm. In 2010, founding partner Peter Bohlin, FAIA received the AIA Gold Medal, the highest honor given by the American Institute of Architects to an individual. In 2013, BCJ was the recipient of the Architectural Record Good Design is Good Business Lifetime Achievement Architecture Award. The firm has received numerous awards for the designs of libraries, visitor centers, housing, and sustainable design. In 2012 they won the EuroShop RetailDesign award for the Uniqlo flagship store in Shanghai based on the strength of its spectacular dynamic merchandising. The centre of the building contains the main attraction: a striking 20-metre high atrium with "flying mannequins" moving from top to bottom at a pace set by music.

== Projects ==
- Copperhill Mountain Lodge: Åre, Sweden
- Grand Teton National Park Discovery and Visitors Center: Jackson, Wyoming
- Apple Store: Fifth Avenue
- Uniqlo Flagship Store Shanghai
- Apple Store: SoHo
- Apple Store: Upper West Side
- Apple Store: 14th Street
- Apple Store: Boylston Street
- Apple Store: Regent Street, London
- Apple Store: Carrousel du Louvre, Paris
- Apple Store: Sydney, Australia
- Apple Store: Ginza, Japan
- Apple Store: Shinsaibashi, Japan
- Apple Store: San Francisco
- Apple Store: Chestnut Street
- Apple Store: Scottsdale, Arizona
- Apple Store: North Michigan Avenue
- The Episcopal Academy Newtown Square, Pennsylvania
- The William J. Nealon Federal Building and Courthouse: Scranton, Pennsylvania
- The Pocono Environmental Education Center: Dingmans Ferry, Pennsylvania
- Seattle City Hall: Seattle, Washington (in joint venture with Bassetti Architects)
- Mills College, Lorry I. Lokey Graduate School of Business: Oakland, California
- Pixar Headquarters: Emeryville, California
- Adobe Systems: San Francisco, California
- Liberty Bell Center: Philadelphia, Pennsylvania
- The Barn at Fallingwater, for the Western Pennsylvania Conservancy
- Ballard Library & Neighborhood Service Center: Ballard, Seattle
- Bill Gates House, Medina, Washington
- Williams College, North & South Academic Buildings: Williamstown, Massachusetts
- Forest House: Connecticut
- The Ledge House: Maryland
- Creekside House: California
- Umerani Residence: California
- House at the Shawangunks: New York
- Combs Point Residence: New York
- Envelope House: Washington
- Gosline House: Washington
- Woodway Residence: Washington
- Lily Lake Residence: Pennsylvania
- House in the Blue Mountains: Pennsylvania
- House in the Endless Mountains: Pennsylvania
- Waverly: Pennsylvania
- Point House: Montana
- House on Lake Tahoe: Nevada
- Farrar Residence: Utah
- Maxwell School of Citizenship and Public Affairs
- Fisher Science and Academic Center, Bard College at Simon's Rock
- Sellinger School of Business and Management, Loyola University Maryland
- Winchester Thurston School, North Hills Campus: Pittsburgh, Pennsylvania
- The Walt Disney Company, Grand Central Creative Campus: Glendale, California
- Newport Beach Civic Center and Park
- Lauder College House, University of Pennsylvania: Philadelphia, Pennsylvania
- Gutmann College House, University of Pennsylvania: Philadelphia, Pennsylvania
- Clough Undergraduate Learning Commons, Georgia Institute of Technology: Atlanta, Georgia
- Marcus Nanotechnology Building, Georgia Institute of Technology: Atlanta, Georgia
- Thomas M. Siebel Center for Computer Science, University of Illinois Urbana-Champaign
- Siebel Center for Design, University of Illinois Urbana-Champaign
- Computer Science and Engineering Building, University of California, San Diego

== Publications ==
- Liberty Bell Center: Bohlin Cywinski Jackson, 2006 ISBN 978-0-9746800-4-0
- Grand Teton: A National Park Building, 2009 ISBN 978-0-9814628-1-3
- Details in architecture: creative detailing by some of the world's leading architects. 1999 ISBN 978-1-876907-80-8
- Arcadian Architecture: Bohlin Cywinski Jackson-12 Houses, Oscar Riera Ojeda, Thomas Fisher, 2005 ISBN 978-0-8478-2696-4
- Bohlin Cywinski Jackson: The Nature of Circumstance: Bohlin Cywinski Jackson, 2010 ISBN 978-0-8478-3293-4
- Bohlin Cywinski Jackson: Farrar: Ojeda, Fisher (Introduction), 2007 ISBN 978-0-9774672-7-3
- Bohlin Cywinski Jackson: Listening: Rizzoli, 2015 ISBN 978-0847846320
