= Newport Beach Civic Center and Park =

Community park in Newport Beach, California

Coordinates: 33.60984°N 117.87198°W

The Newport Beach Civic Center and Park is a civic center and community park located in Newport Beach, California. It is situated on a 16-acre lot that is bordered by Avocado Avenue and MacArthur Boulevard.

== History ==
The project was officially approved in 2008. The Newport Beach City Council created a design competition to allow architects to bid for the project. The competition was overseen by a chosen committee of local architects. Out of the 50 teams of architects and landscape architects, 5 finalists were chosen. Each of these teams had three months and $50,000 to prepare a concept plan. The Newport Beach City Council chose Bohlin Cywinski Jackson (BCJ) was chosen along with PWP Landscape Architecture for landscaping.

== Costs ==
From the start of construction in 2010 to the completed product in 2013, the cost surged from $105 million to $140.2 million. However, after audit results, R.W. Block Consulting and Harris concluded that incomplete financial documents, inconsistent reports, and poor documenting could have contributed to an increased cost. The project manager and lead contractor of the Civic Center plans to return the city $365,000 after the audit showed that up to $1.2 million could have been overbilled. The table below shows the data available to the public during the construction period from the Capital Improvement Plan.

Data From City of Newport Beach Capital Improvement Plan by Year
Fiscal Year	Funding Source	Rebudget $	Yearly Total
2011-12	Civic Center	$1,641,700	
2011-12	OCIP Insurance	$250,000	
2011-12	OCIP Premiums	$260,000	
2011-12	OCIP Loss Claims	$1,062,600	$3,214,300
2012-13	Civic Center and Park	$577,844	
2012-13	Civic Center Construction	$704,349	
2012-13	Civic Center OCIP Loss Claims	$1,034,524	$2,316,717
2013-14	Civic Center - Other	$677,764	
2013-14	Civic Center - Construction	$5,956,318	
2013-14	Civic Center - FF&E	$4,153	
2013-14	Civic Center - OCIP	$967,379	
2013-14	Civic Center - IT/AV	$119,094	$7,724,708

== Architecture design ==
Bohlin Cywinski Jackson (BCJ) won the commission to outfit the site with a new 100,000-square-foot City Hall that runs alongside a public green. The architecture is inspired by the city's beachside Southern California roots and includes many subtle nautical references. BCJ thoughtfully designed numerous outdoor spaces so residents can enjoy the year-round sunny climate and implemented long, narrow buildings emphasizing figurative and literal transparency. Anchoring the green at the north end is a late addition to the project brief: a 17,000-square-foot addition to an existing public library that serves as a backdrop for public events. Bordering it on the other side is a parking structure that accommodates 450 cars; pedestrian paths crisscross the green every 60 feet to allow access between the two long structures on either side. The site also includes a community park with a lookout tower for ocean views, a pedestrian bridge to allow safe passage across a nine-lane roadway that bisects the site, Newport Beach's first dog park, and other amenities.

== Park design ==
The existing site required significant technical effort to allow for the realization of successful horticultural conditions. The park was designed by PWP Landscape Architecture. The park is conceived as a series of planting characters that respond to both design program and existing conditions, linked by a series of meandering paths. Civic gardens adjacent to City Hall in the southern portion of the site transition to park land made up of multiple meadows, habitat for native flora and fauna, trails, bridges over an existing wetland, and extensive native California planting. These additions gives Newport Beach residents an additional place to hike and enjoy nature. Sustainable practices include on-site storm-water treatment with extensive swales and retention basins integrated into planting.

== Amenities ==
The space includes a large meeting and banquet room, civic lawn, large outdoor patio, warming kitchen, presentation and audio/visual equipment, and parking in structure. The venue holds 150 banquet seats and 180 theater seats in addition to the 1500 the Civic Lawn can hold. The civic center lawn hosts a concert series. The center also hosted the 55th Annual Newport Beach Art Exhibition and houses many events of the Newport Beach Arts Foundation. The Newport Beach Art Exhibition features over 250 works of art, including painting, mixed media, sculpture and photography.
