= Savoy-Plaza Hotel =

Demolished hotel in Manhattan, New York

Coordinates: 40.7638°N 73.9728°W

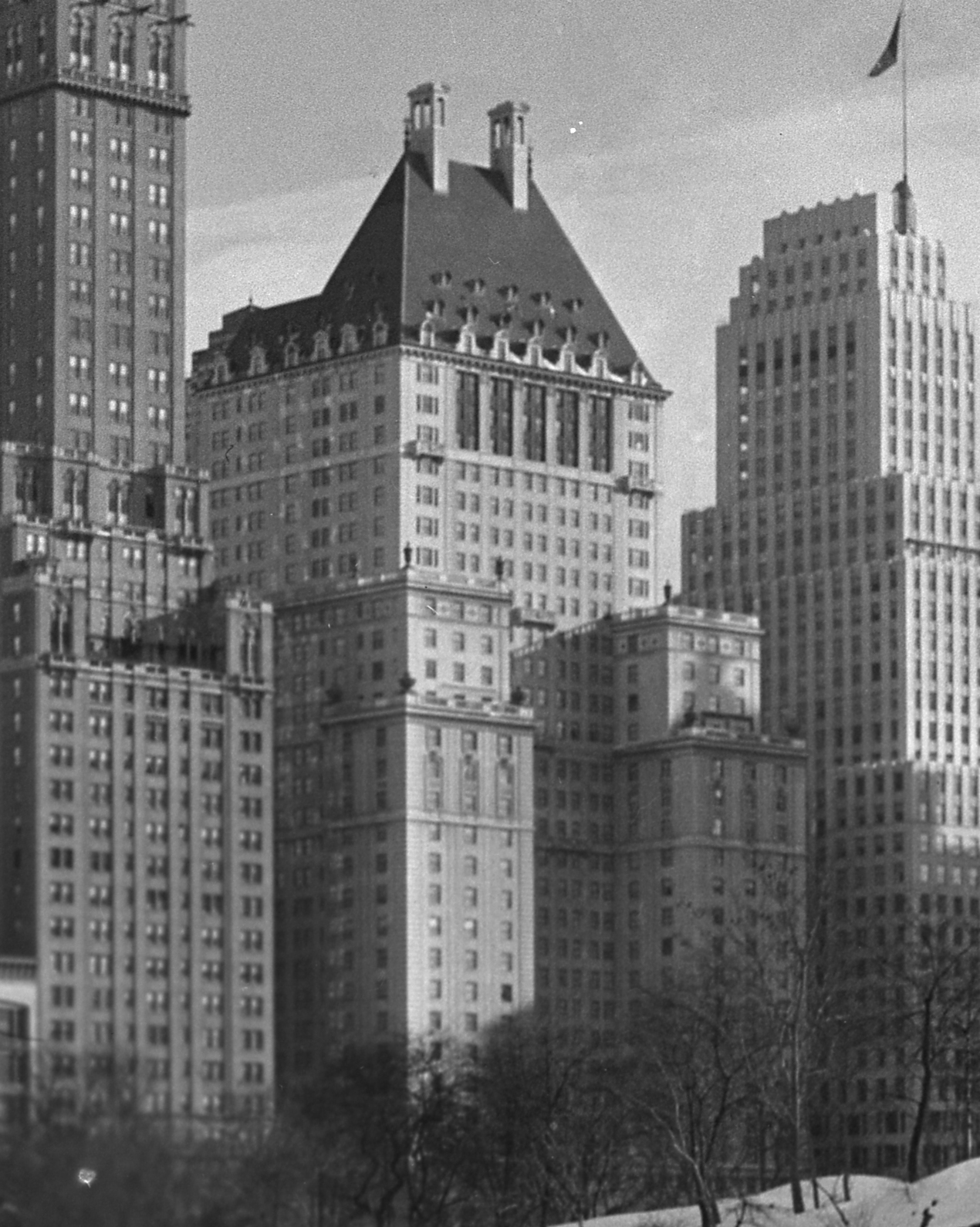
- Savoy-Plaza Hotel seen from The Pond and Hallett Nature Sanctuary in Central Park in 1933
- Interactive map of the Savoy-Plaza Hotel area

General information
- Location: New York City, New York, 767 5th Avenue
- Opening: October 1, 1927
- Demolished: 1965

Height
- Height: 420 ft (130 m)

Technical details
- Floor count: 33

Design and construction
- Architect: McKim, Mead & White

Other information
- Number of rooms: 1,000

The Savoy-Plaza Hotel was a 33-story hotel overlooking Central Park at Fifth Avenue and East 59th Street in Midtown Manhattan, New York City. It opened in 1927 and was demolished in 1965.

== History ==
=== Original Savoy Hotel ===
The original Savoy Hotel at Fifth Avenue and 59th Street opened in June 1892, following the opening of the neighboring Plaza Hotel in 1890. The original 12-story Savoy was designed by architect Ralph S. Townsend, for landowners including New York Supreme Court Justice P. Henry Dugro. The old Savoy continued to expand into the 1920s, and its furnishings were sold in 1925.

=== Savoy-Plaza Hotel ===
Harry S. Black, owner of the Plaza, bought the Savoy Hotel, consolidated the block, and demolished it to commission a newer companion to the older establishment from the architects of the Plaza. The 33-story, 420-foot (130 m) skyscraper Savoy-Plaza Hotel was designed by McKim, Mead & White, built at a cost of $30 million, and opened on October 1, 1927. In September 1955, the Russeks women's clothing store opened a shop selling furs at the hotel.

Hilton Hotels acquired the hotel in January 1957 through an exchange of stock with Savoy-Plaza, Inc. Hilton opened a Trader Vic's within the hotel on April 14, 1958, in a space formerly occupied by the Red Coach Inn. On December 31, 1958, the full merger of Savoy-Plaza, Inc. and Hilton Hotels Corporation became effective, and the hotel was renamed the Savoy Hilton. Hilton sold the hotel to Webb & Knapp, Inc. in May 1962, for $25 million. That November, Webb & Knapp resold a two-thirds interest to British Commercial Property Investments and a one-third interest to London Merchant Securities. Hilton and the hotel's owners agreed to end the chain's management of the hotel in 1964, though the contract continued through 1967. Western International Hotels assumed management on June 2, 1964, renaming the property The Savoy Plaza, without the original hyphen.

The owners announced plans for the hotel's demolition on August 21, 1964, leading to a significant public outcry and protests. On December 16, 1964, the owners announced that the hotel would be replaced by a 48-story office tower, designed by Edward Durell Stone to house the Eastern headquarters of General Motors. The hotel remained open through the 1964 New York World's Fair, finally closing in October 1965. It was demolished in late 1965 and early 1966 and replaced with the General Motors Building, completed in 1968.

== See also ==
- List of former hotels in Manhattan
- List of tallest voluntarily demolished buildings
