= Lord Simcoe Hotel =

Coordinates: 43.647721°N 79.384739°W

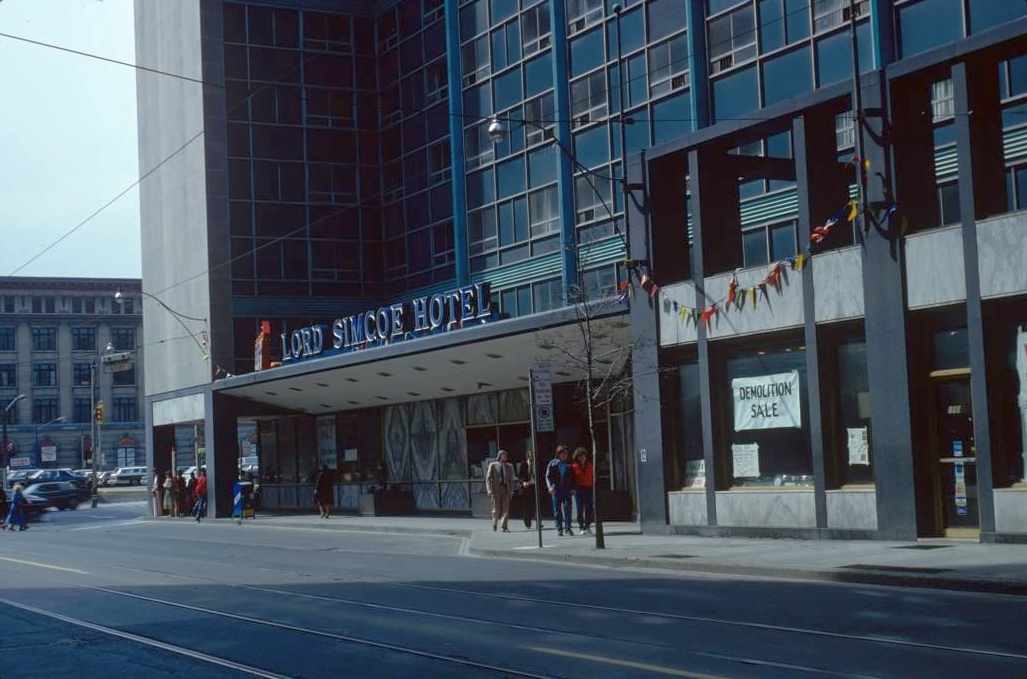
- The Lord Simcoe Hotel, c. 1980
- Interactive map of the Lord Simcoe Hotel area

General information
- Type: High-rise
- Architectural style: Modernist
- Location: Toronto, Ontario, Canada, 150 King Street West
- Completed: 1956
- Demolished: 1981
- Client: Angus Robertson Ltd. J.A. Norton and Co. Ltd. RYBKA; Teperman Group; Williams & Williams Ltd. Toronto Stock Exchange

Design and construction
- Architects: Henry T. Langston, Peter Dickinson

Lord Simcoe Hotel was one of many now vanished hotels in Toronto, Ontario, Canada. Built in 1956, the 20-storey concrete and glass modernist structure was designed by Henry T. Langston and Peter Dickinson. The hotel was named for John Graves Simcoe, Lieutenant Governor of Upper Canada and a resident of York, Upper Canada (now Toronto). The name was somewhat incorrect as Simcoe was never called or given the title of Lord.

Located on the northeast corner of King Street and University Avenue (150 King Street West), it was closed in 1979 and torn down in 1981. It was replaced by the Sun Life Centre East Tower in 1984. The hotel was unable to compete with other downtown hotels due to a lack of central air conditioning and convention space. It consistently lost money over its 24-year existence.
