= Copperhill Mountain Lodge =

Hotel in Åre, Sweden

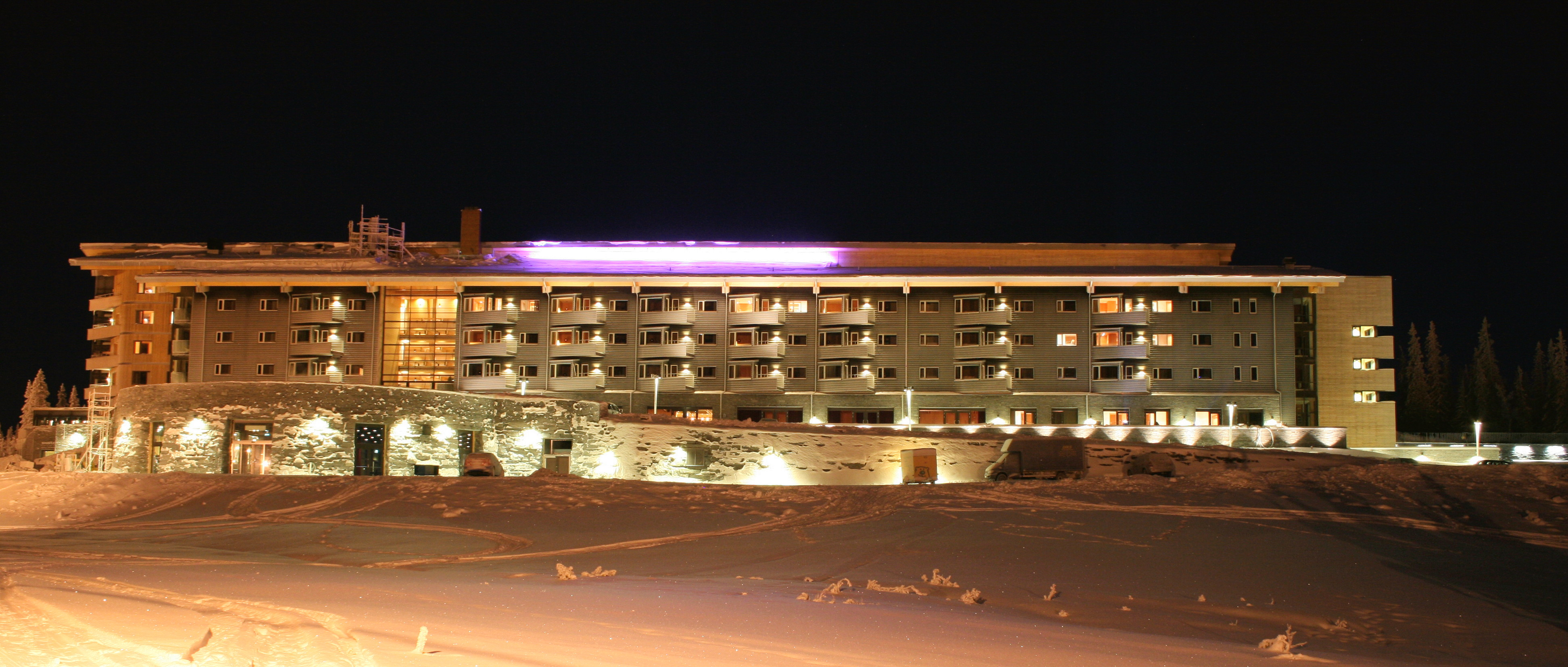
- Copperhill Mountain Lodge at the top of the Förberget Mountain in Åre
- Interactive map of the Copperhill Mountain Lodge area

General information
- Location: Åre, Sweden
- Coordinates: 63°23′0″N 13°10′44″E
- Opening: December 8, 2008
- Owner: Home Properties
- Management: Choice Hotels

Design and construction
- Architect: Peter Bohlin

Other information
- Number of rooms: 112
- Number of restaurants: 2

Website
- Copperhill.se

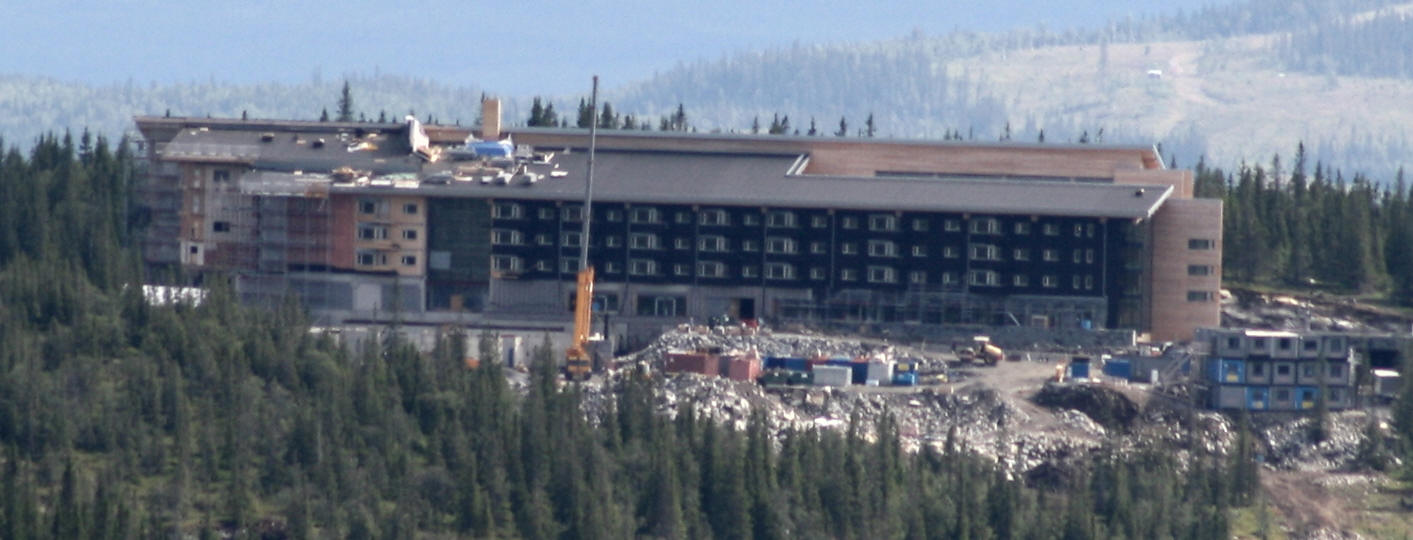
Copperhill Mountain Lodge during construction (August, 2008)

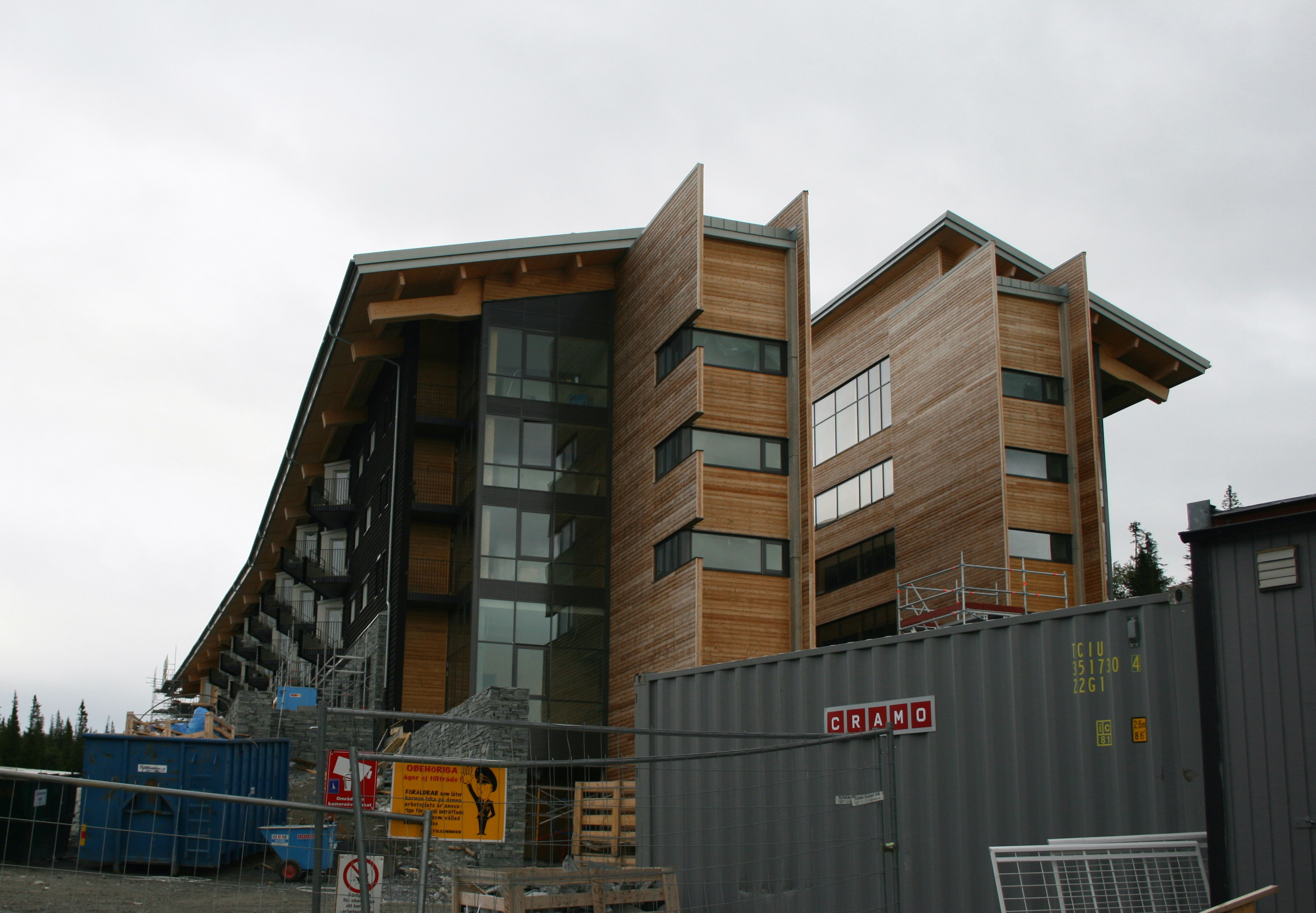
Copperhill Mountain Lodge during construction (August, 2008)

The Copperhill Mountain Lodge is a design hotel on the top of the Förberget Mountain in Åre, Sweden. The hotel opened on December 8, 2008, and is currently one of five hotels in Sweden, and the only mountain hotel in Scandinavia referred to as a Design Hotel. The hotel has 112 rooms and suites, with a total of 420 regular beds and 160 extra beds. It is directly connected to the Åre ski area with its own platter lift, the Copperhill Express.

== History ==
The hotel is designed by American architect Peter Bohlin. It was originally supposed to consist of co-op apartments, but there was only little interest from buyers. In September 2007, construction was suspended as the main investor, Vanilla Ventures, had financial problems. Dutch venture capitalists Peter Cat and Frans Scholtes later entered the project under condition that Vanilla Ventures dropped out of the project.

When the hotel opened in 2008, the project cost had grown to SEK 730 million, exceeding the original budget with about 230 million. Thus, the project ended up in a financial difficulties shortly after its grand opening and underwent financial reconstruction. On February 23, 2009, the investors applied for bankruptcy protection, and on April 26, the hotel was closed with all its staff being laid off.

On August 28, 2009, it was announced that the hotel was purchased by the company Home Properties for 200 million SEK. The operation of the hotel is currently managed by Nordic Hotels & Resorts.

== In popular culture ==
The interiors of the Copperhill Mountain Lodge feature in Ruben Östlund's Force Majeure as the French luxury resort the movie is set in.
