= Derwent London =

British-based property investment business

Derwent London plc
- Type: Public limited company
- Traded as: LSE: DLN; FTSE 250 component
- Industry: Real estate
- Founded: 1984
- Headquarters: London, England
- Key people: Mark Breuer, Chairman; Jonathan Murphy, CEO
- Revenue: ▲£406.3 million (2025)
- Operating income: ▲£210.5 million (2025)
- Net income: ▲£161.1 million (2025)
- Website: derwentlondon.com

Derwent London plc is a British-based property investment and development company. It is headquartered in London and is a constituent of the FTSE 250 Index.

== History ==
The business was originally established as the operator of the Derwent Valley Light Railway, which opened in 1913. The railway closed in 1981 and in 1984 John Burns used the former operating company, Derwent Valley Holdings, as the vehicle with which to develop his London-based property business. It joined the FTSE EPRA/NAREIT Developed Europe index on 31 December 1999 when it was launched, trading under the name Derwent Valley Holdings.

In 2007 Derwent Valley Holdings merged with London Merchant Securities plc to form Derwent London. This deal was hailed as "the deal of the decade" by the editor of Property Week. In July 2007 the company converted to a real estate investment trust.

== Operations ==
The group is organised as one business – property investment and development. At 31 December 2025 its portfolio was valued at £5.1bn.

== Fitzrovia portfolio ==
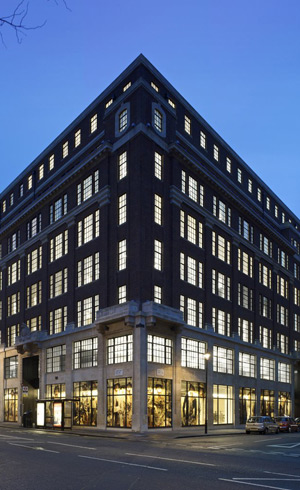
Horseferry House, a development by Derwent London near Lambeth Bridge, completed in 2008

From the merger with London Merchant Securities the company acquired 800,000 square feet (74,000 m^{2}) of property to add to its existing Fitzrovia portfolio. This gave the company about 1,000,000 square feet (93,000 m^{2}) of property over more than 30 sites in Fitzrovia; about one fifth of the company's total portfolio. In November 2009 the company announced plans to transform part of Fitzrovia in central London into a new retail destination with cafes and restaurants. The company's plans were criticised in the local paper Fitzrovia News who accused the company of wanting to change the character of the neighbourhood.

In July 2010 the company held an exhibition outlining its proposals for the Saatchi building in Charlotte Street: Fitzrovia News reported that Camden Council had confirmed that the Fitzrovia Partnership was intending to become a Business Improvement District (BID).

== The Turnmill Building Farringdon ==
In 2009 the company's plans to demolish Farringdon's famous Turnmills were turned down by London Borough of Islington after a campaign to save the building by local people. The company wanted to replace the 19th-century stables building with a glass and steel tower block. The company then appealed to the planning inspectorate, but their appeal was refused. Subsequently, a revised planning application was granted approval and work on the new building commenced in April 2012. This will create a 70,000 sq ft office and retail property close to the new Farringdon station Crossrail interchange.
