= Charles Wade (disambiguation) =

Charles Wade (1863–1922) was the premier of New South Wales, 1907–10.

Charles or Charlie Wade may also refer to:

- Charles Paget Wade (1883–1956), English architect and artist
- Charlie Wade (born 1963), American volleyball coach
- Charlie Wade (American football) (born 1950), American football wide receiver
