= Lygon Arms =

The Lygon Arms
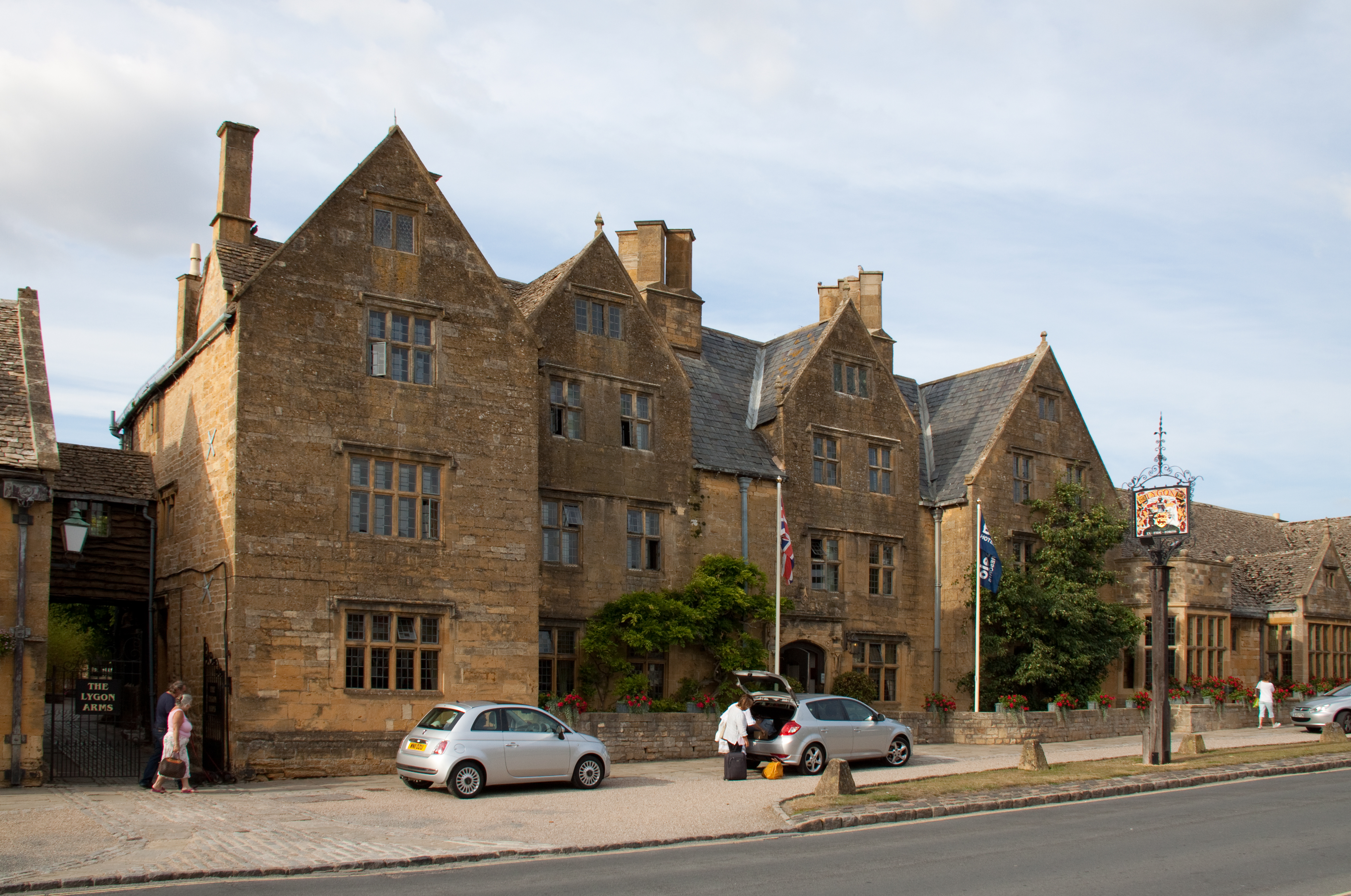
- The exterior from Broadway's High Street

- Location within Worcestershire Location within England
- Hotel chain: Iconic Hotels & Resorts

General information
- Coordinates: 52.0362°N 1.8611°W
- Owner: Ian Livingstone and Richard Livingstone

Other information
- Number of restaurants: 2
- Number of bars: 2

Website
- lygonarmshotel.co.uk

The Lygon Arms (/ˈlɪɡən/ LIG-ən) is a Grade II* listed hotel in Broadway, Worcestershire, in the Cotswolds region of England. It was originally a coaching inn and is now part of Iconic Hotels & Resorts. The current building dates from the seventeenth century.

== History ==
The Lygon Arms was built in the 14th century and was a key connection between Wales, Worcester and London during the Elizabethan era. The earliest written record of the inn dates to 1377 and refers to the building as "The White Hart". However, the listing dates the current structure to the early seventeenth century.

The coaching inn played a role in the English Civil War in 1649, serving both sides. Oliver Cromwell stayed there before the Battle of Worcester in 1651. Charles I also used it as a place to meet his supporters during the unrest.

The inn continued to be used as a staging post into the eighteenth century for mail coaches travelling between London and Wales. By the 1900s, the Lygon Arms was owned by Sydney Bolton Russell, whose son, Gordon Russell, restored antique furniture for the hotel in a loft above the coach house. Gordon Russell would become one of England’s leading designers in the 1930s.

King Edward VII visited the hotel between 1905 and 1910, as did his grandson, the future Edward VIII. In 1963 Richard Burton and Elizabeth Taylor stayed at the hotel during the height of the scandal surrounding their affair. The hotel has also been visited by Prince Philip, Evelyn Waugh, and Kylie Minogue.

== Development ==
Sydney Bolton Russell (1866–1938) bought the Lygon Arms in 1903 from the Midlands brewer Samuel Allsopp & Sons, after first visiting the property in the early 1900s while he worked as a manager for the company. Russell renovated the property in 1910 in a Tudor and Stuart period style, with the help of the Arts and Crafts architect Charles Bateman (1863–1947). Russell recounted the experience of acquiring the Lygon Arms in his book The Story of an Old English Hostelry, published in 1914. In 1915, Russell moved out of the newly refurbished hotel to the village of Snowshill with the aim of separating his business and personal life.

At the start of 2016 the new owners of the Lygon Arms, Ian Livingstone and Richard Livingstone, announced that the property would be going under extensive redevelopment.
