= Broadway War Memorial =

War memorial in Broadway, Worcestershire, England

Coordinates: 52°02′09″N 1°51′46″W

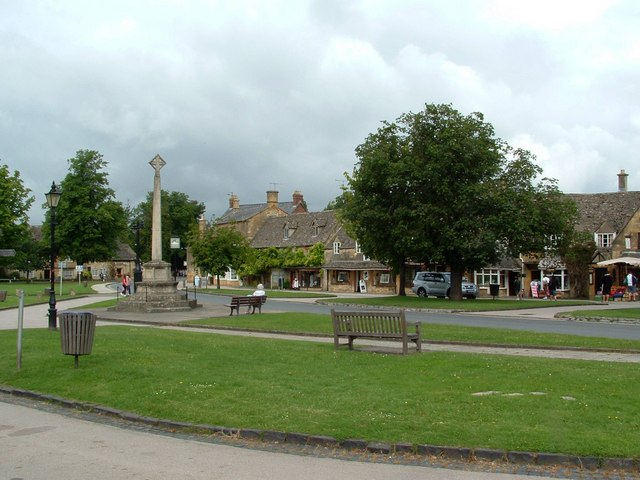
The memorial and village green in July 2009.

The Broadway War Memorial is located on the village green in the village of Broadway in Worcestershire. The memorial marks the deaths of local individuals who died fighting in World War I and World War II.

The memorial is a tall thin limestone octagonal pillar on a three stepped octagonal base, topped with a Latin cross in a diamond shaped frame. The sides of the octagonal stone base bear the names of local individuals who died fighting in the two world wars. 38 individuals from the First World War are commemorated, with 21 from the Second World War, and a single individual who died in the Malayan Emergency.

It was built c.1920 and designed by F. L. Griggs. It was featured in Charles Marriott's 1924 book, Modern English Architecture.

It has been Grade II listed on the National Heritage List for England since July 1987. Alan Brooks, writing in the Worcestershire volume of the Pevsner Architectural Guides, describes the memorial as "excellent".

== Inscription ==
The memorial is inscribed:

1914 - 18 / IN MEMORY OF THE MEN / OF BROADWAY / WHO DIED IN THE WAR OF / MCMXIV-XIX AND IN HONOUR / OF THEIR COMRADES/ (NAMES) 1939 - 1945/ (NAMES)
