= Gordon Russell (designer) =

English designer, craftsman and educationist

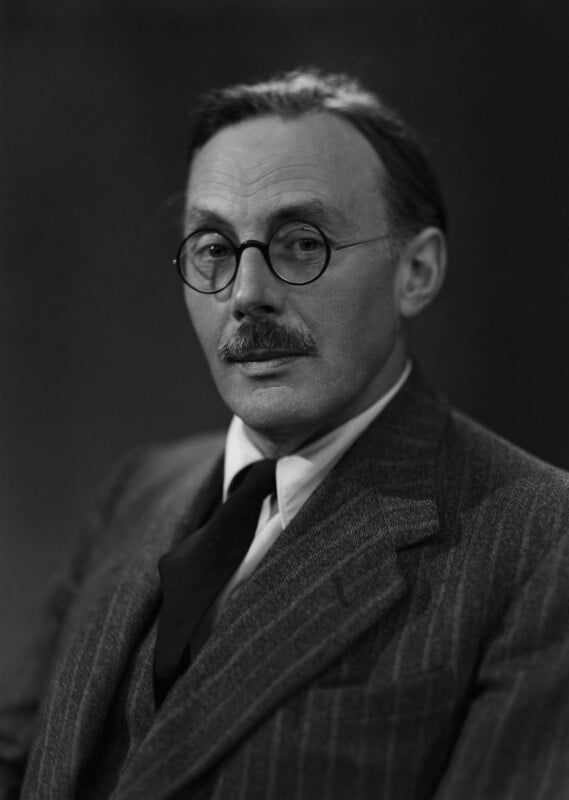
Russell in 1950

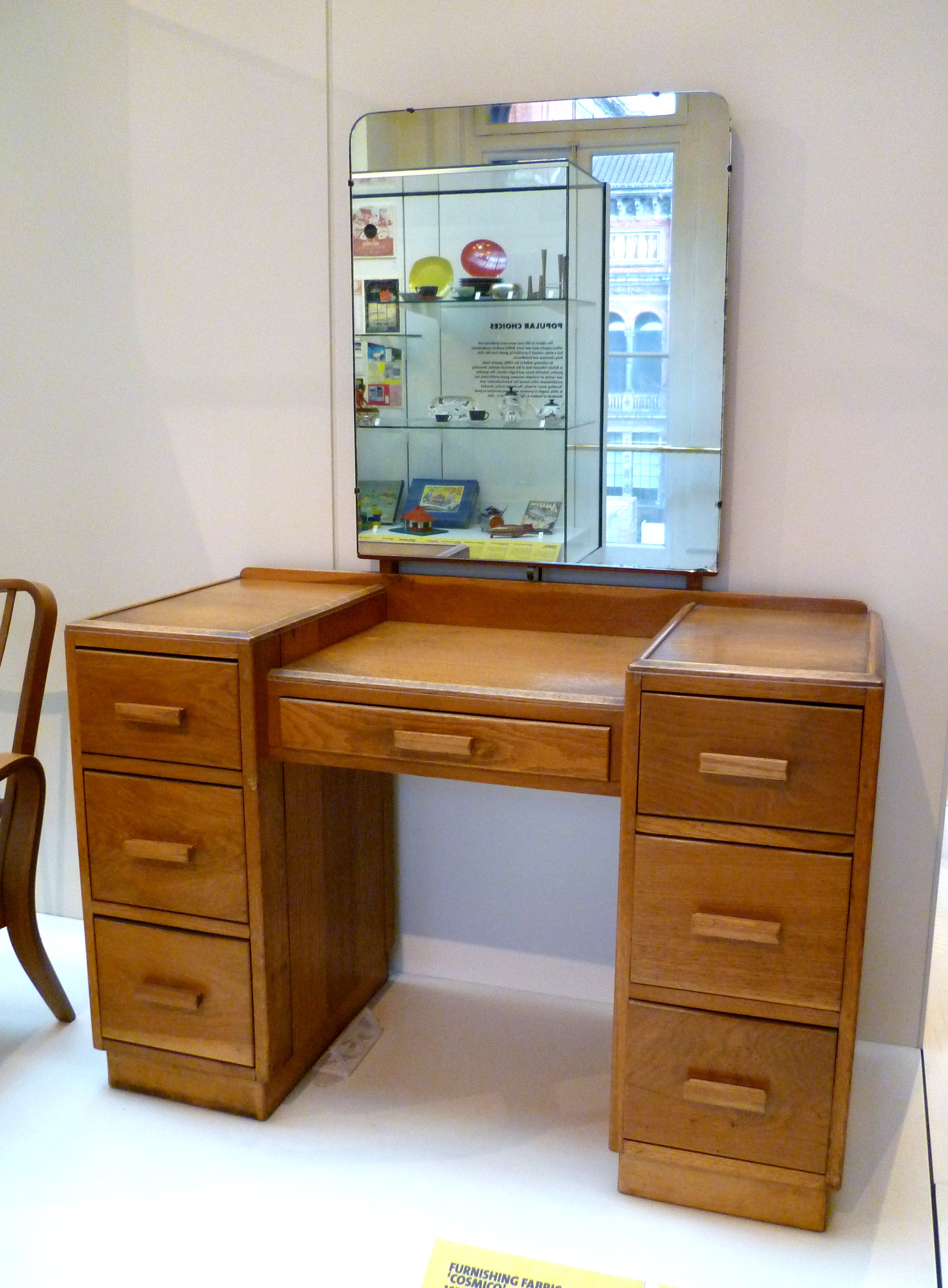
A dressing table designed by the Utility Design Panel c. 1943. Made by Heal & Son, 1947. Oak.

Sir Sydney Gordon Russell, CBE, MC, RDI, FSIA (20 May 1892 – 7 October 1980) was an English designer, craftsman and educationist.

== Biography ==
Gordon Russell was born in Cricklewood, London to Sydney Bolton Russell and Elizabeth Russell (née Shefford). His father was a clerk in a bank but was later offered a job by George Allsopp in Burton-on-Trent, the brewers. The family moved to live in Repton. When Gordon was twelve years old his father bought the Lygon Arms Inn in Broadway Worcestershire and the family moved again to live in the hotel. Gordon went to the Grammar School at the nearby town of Chipping Campden (or just Campden as it was known then).

In 1921 Russell married Toni Denning. In 1925 he bought a 1 1/2-acre plot on Kingcombe Lane near Dover's Hill overlooking Chipping Campden where they built their home, which they called Kingcombe. They lived at Kingcombe for the rest of their lives, extending it several times over the years, and raised their four children there.

== Career ==
He came under the influence of the Arts and Crafts movement from 1904 after his father had moved to Broadway in the Cotswolds to be hotelier at the Lygon Arms, through the Guild of Handicraft, the community of metalworkers, enamellers, wood carvers, furniture makers, and printers brought in 1902 by C. R. Ashbee from east London to Chipping Campden.

Following service as an officer in World War I, for which he was awarded the Military Cross in 1918, he became a furniture maker and designer. In 1925 Russell won a gold medal at the Paris Exhibition with a cabinet, with internal drawers lined with boxwood, ebony and laburnum, and valued in 2013 at £50,000 to £60,000. He designed the "Stow" range of furniture in the mid 1920s.

During World War II he was instrumental in developing utility furniture as chairman of the government's Utility Furniture Design Panel. In 1943 he became chairman of the Utility Design Panel. In 1947 Russell became director of the Council of Industrial Design (COID) (later renamed the Design Council). He became the first chairman of the Crafts Council. In the 1950's, he was joined in the business of Gordon Russell Ltd by Ray Leigh, who became Design Director in 1957. The business continued as Russell, Hodgson & Leigh after his death. He was awarded a knighthood in 1955 for services to design. Russell was elected to the Art Workers' Guild in 1927, and was elected as Master in 1962. He was a member of the Red Rose Guild. He wrote a number of books on furniture, including Furniture (1947), How to Buy Furniture (1947), The Story of Furniture (1947, with Jacques Groag, later published as Looking at Furniture (1953, 1964)). In 1968 he published his autobiography, Designer's Trade.

== Portrait bust of Sir Gordon Russell ==
Gordon Russell sat for sculptor Alan Thornhill for a portrait in clay. The correspondence file relating to the Russell portrait bust is held in the archive of the Henry Moore Foundation's Henry Moore Institute in Leeds and the terracotta remains in the collection of the family. A Bronze is in the collection of the Gordon Russell Design Museum in Broadway, Worcestershire. The museum is located in Russell's former drawing office and workshop; it was opened by Sir Terence Conran in 2008.

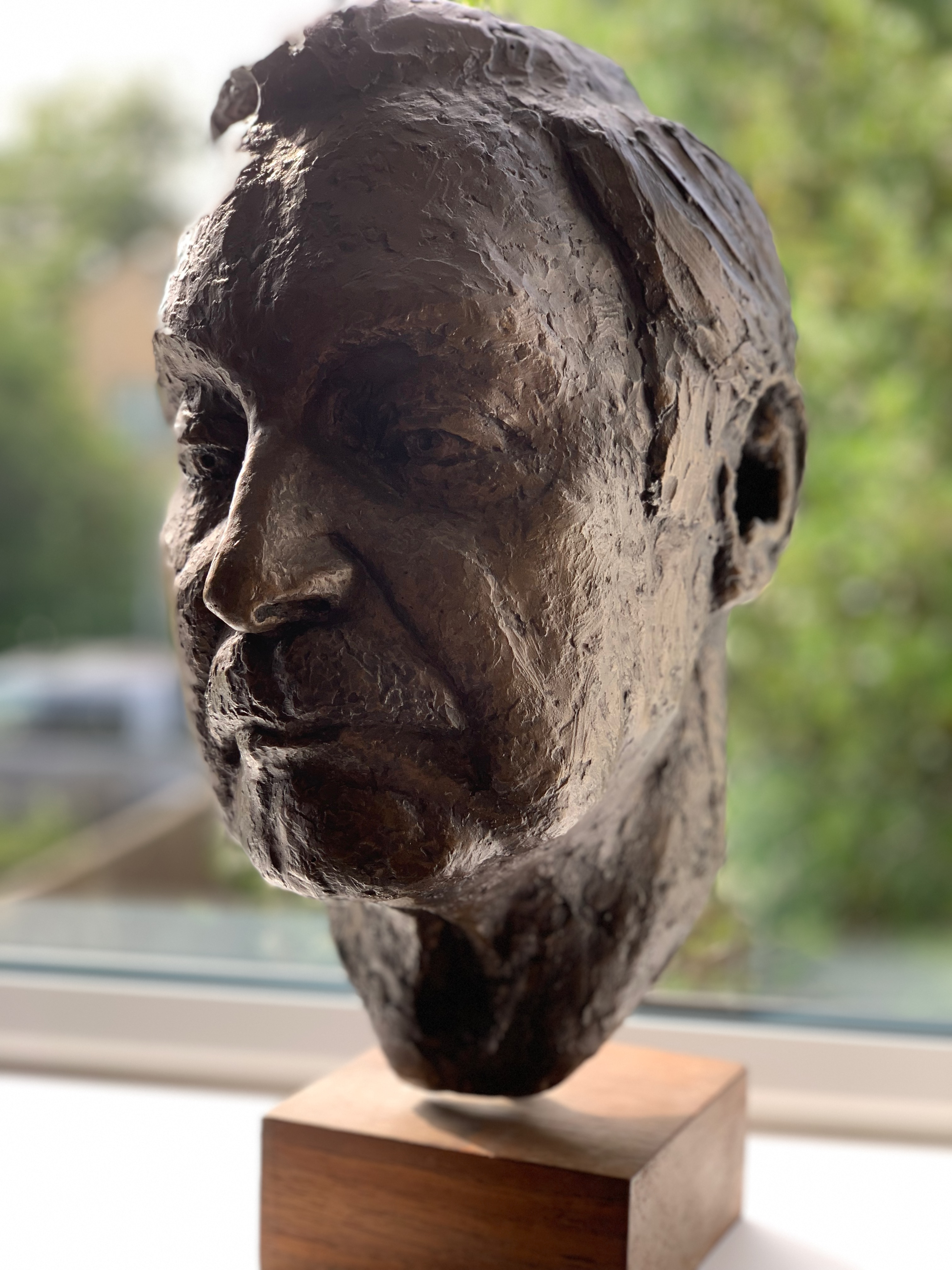
GR by Alan Thornhill

== References and sources ==
Sources

- Fiona MacCarthy, "Russell, Sir (Sydney) Gordon (1892–1980)", Oxford Dictionary of National Biography, Oxford University Press, September 2004; online edn, May 2006 accessed 9 December 2006
