= Ray Leigh =

British architect (1928–2025)

Ray Leigh MBE RIBA AA Dipl Hon FRCA
- Born: 6 June 1928; Streatham, England
- Died: 13 March 2025 (aged 96)
- Citizenship: United Kingdom
- Education: Whitgift School, Croydon, The Architectural Association
- Occupations: Architect & Designer
- Years active: 1949-2008
- Partner: Jean Leigh
- Children: 3
- Practice: UK

Ray Leigh MBE RIBA (6 June 1928 – 13 March 2025) was a British architect and designer. He was especially influential in the field of furniture design and was a key figure in the post-war furniture making industry in the UK.

== Early life and education ==
Leigh was born in Streatham, London where his father worked as a civil servant but spent the war years in Morecambe where the family was evacuated. Inspired by the Art Deco Midland Hotel in the town designed by architect Oliver Hill, he continued his education at the Architectural Association. There, he was in a class of students under Sir Frederick Gibberd who went on to make a significant contribution to post-war design and architecture in the UK; Sir Philip Dowson, Richard Burton, Ted Cullinan, Sir Colin St John Wilson and Julian Keable. Roderick Gradidge and Michael Blower were also his contemporaries.

== Career ==
After National Service in the Royal Engineers, he started in the office of Dick Russell, brother of Gordon Russell to work on the interior fit out of buildings for the 1951 Festival of Britain. He worked closely there and made lifelong friendships with figures such as Sir James Stirling, 'Jacko' Moya and Sir Philp Powell, John Piper, Mary Shand, Terence Conran and Robin Wade. After the Festival, he joined Sir Gordon Russell, the influential furniture designer in his eponymous business Russell, Hodgson & Leigh (1957–1967), eventually making Partner. In 1967 he became Senior Designer of the firm, and later became managing director and eventually chair, where it grew into a business of 200 people at its peak. The firm was sold in 1986 after which he became involved in advocacy for the furniture making industry.

== Significant projects ==
Leigh was responsible for the chairs for Coventry Cathedral designed by Sir Basil Spence, a classic of post-war design, designed by Dick Russell, Gordon's brother.

== Public life ==
Leigh was President of the Guild of Gloucester Craftsmen, Mayor of Chipping Camden, Master of the Worshipful Company of Furniture Makers in 1984, a founding trustee of Crafts Council, Chair of Furniture Industry Research Association, and Chair of the Edward Barnsley Educational Trust.

== Personal life and death ==
Leigh had three children two of whom pre-deceased him. He was married for 72 years to Jean. Leigh died on 13 March 2025, at the age of 96.

== Legacy ==
Leigh's archive is held by the Gordon Russell Design Museum, a project which he advocated in the former premises of the business, in Broadway in the Cotswolds.

== Bibliography ==
- Advance the Product. Gordon Russell Furniture - Continuing Adventure (1946-1986), by Ray Leigh. Broadway: Gordon Russell Trust, 2015 (paperback, ISBN 978-0-9575313-2-1)
- A Change of Direction. Gordon Russell Furniture (1930–1940), by Ray Leigh. Broadway: Gordon Russell Trust, 2017 (paperback, ISBN 978-0-9575313-4-5)
- Drawn to Design. The Work of Sir Gordon Russell, by Ray Leigh & Trevor Chinn. Broadway: Gordon Russell Trust, 2013 (paperback, ISBN 978-0-9575313-0-7)
