= Philip Dowson =

British architect and former President of the Royal Academy (b.1924 and d.2014)

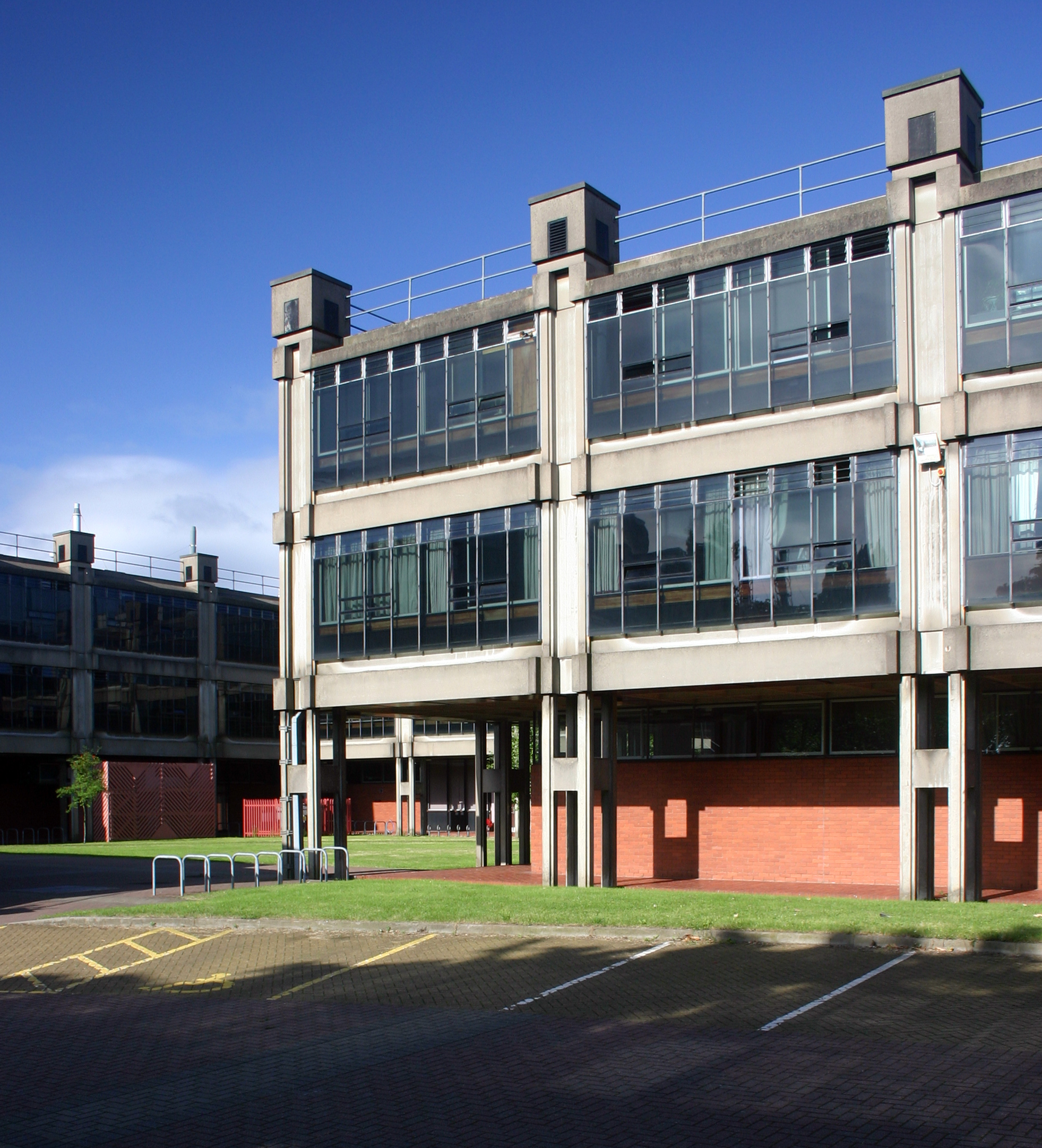
The Metallurgy and Materials building at the University of Birmingham, designed by Philip Dowson of Arup Associates

Sir Philip Henry Manning Dowson CBE PRA (16 August 1924 – 22 August 2014) was a leading British architect. He served as President of the Royal Academy from 1993 to 1999.

== Early life ==
Philip Dowson was born in South Africa. Having moved to England, he was educated at Gresham's School in Holt, Norfolk, from 1938 to 1942. He was then accepted to read engineering at Clare College, Cambridge, but soon after matriculation was called up for officer training in the Royal Navy. The initial part of this training took place at University College, Oxford, where he stayed as a cadet for six months. (He was later to design four student accommodation blocks in Stavertonia, a residential building complex in North Oxford commissioned by University College in the 1960s.) He remained with the Navy throughout the Second World War and was only demobilised in 1946, when he was briefly sent to a sanatorium in Mundesley, Norfolk, after contracting tuberculosis.

On leaving the Navy Dowson returned to Clare College, but switched to fine art, which included a course in architecture. After graduating from Cambridge in 1950, he then proceeded to study at the Architectural Association School in London. There, he was in an intake of students under Sir Frederick Gibberd who went on to make a significant contribution to post-war design and architecture in the UK; Ray Leigh, Richard Burton, Ted Cullinan, Sir Colin St John Wilson and Julian Keable. Roderick Gradidge and Michael Blower were also his contemporaries.

== Career ==
From 1953, Dowson worked with the engineer Sir Ove Arup, becoming a founding partner in Arup Associates in 1963 and rising to be the firm's senior partner and Chief Architect in 1969.

Dowson contributed to a large number of major projects, including new buildings for the Universities of Oxford and Cambridge. He died on 22 August 2014, aged 90.

National Life Stories conducted an oral history interview (C467/71) with Dowson in 2002 for its Architects' Lives collection, held by the British Library.

== Honours ==
- 1969 — Commander of the Order of the British Empire
- 1980 Birthday Honours — Knight bachelor
- 1981 — Royal Academician
- 1981 — Royal Gold Medal of the Royal Institute of British Architects
- 1993 — President of the Royal Academy of Arts

Dowson also served as a Trustee of the National Portrait Gallery.

Cultural offices
Preceded by Sir Roger de Grey	President of the Royal Academy; 1993–1999	Succeeded by Phillip King
