= Broadway, Worcestershire =

Village in Worcestershire, England

Coordinates: 52.04°N 1.86°W

Broadway
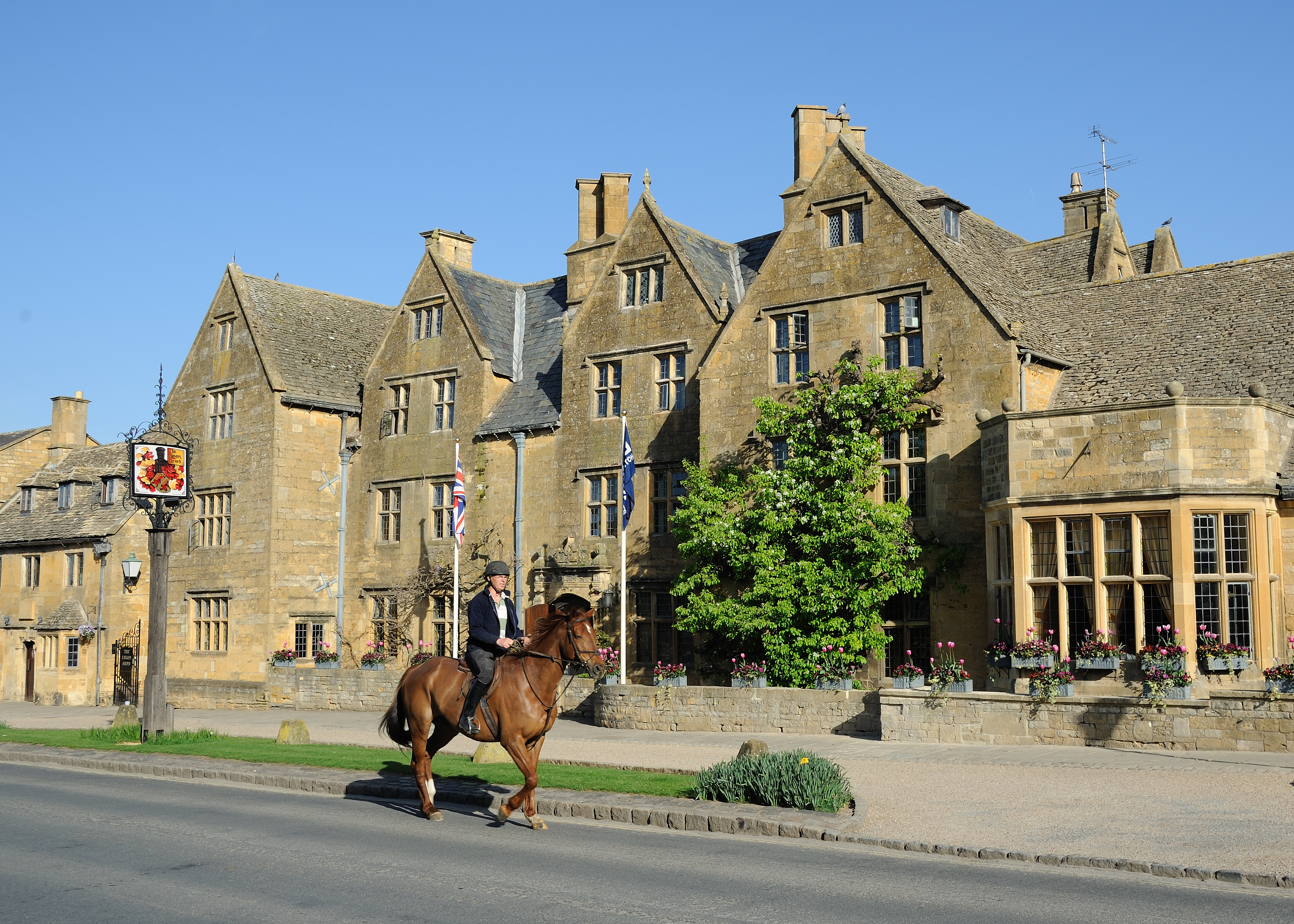
- Lygon Arms, viewed from Broadway High Street

- Location within Worcestershire
- Population: 3,478
- OS grid reference: SP095375
- District: Wychavon
- Shire county: Worcestershire
- Region: West Midlands
- Country: England
- Sovereign state: United Kingdom
- Post town: BROADWAY
- Postcode district: WR12
- Dialling code: 01386
- Police: West Mercia
- Fire: Hereford and Worcester
- Ambulance: West Midlands
- UK Parliament: Droitwich and Evesham

Broadway is a large village and civil parish in the Cotswolds, England, with a population of 3,478 at the 2021 census. It is in the far southeast of Worcestershire, close to the Gloucestershire border, midway between Evesham and Moreton-in-Marsh. It is sometimes referred to as the "Jewel of the Cotswolds".

Broadway village lies beneath Fish Hill on the western Cotswold escarpment. The "broad way" is the wide grass-fringed main street, centred on the Green, which is lined with red chestnut trees and honey-coloured Cotswold limestone buildings, many dating from the 16th century. It is known for its association with the Arts and Crafts movement, and is in an area of outstanding scenery and conservation. The wide High Street is lined with a wide variety of shops and cafes, many housed in listed buildings.

== History ==
Broadway is an ancient settlement whose origins are uncertain. There is documentary evidence of activity in the area as far back as Mesolithic times. In 2004, the Council for British Archaeology's Worcestershire Young Archaeologists' Club found evidence of early occupation. Their fieldwork uncovered a large amount of Roman and medieval domestic waste and, most importantly, a large amount of worked Mesolithic flints, raising the possibility that the site might have been a stopping point for hunter-gatherers. This work makes the known history of the village to be over 5,000 years and so may be evidence of one of the first partially settled sites in the United Kingdom. Broadway has also seen the settlement of the ancient Beaker people (1900 BCE), and later, the Roman occupation. It gained the name Bradsetena Gamere (Broad Village) around the 9th century and underwent a number of changes until the modern spelling 'Broadway' became common usage in the 16th century.

Broadway was a domain of the Mercian kings and was vested in the Crown in the person of King Edgar in 967. The first existing documentary evidence of importance is embodied in a charter that King Edgar granted to the Benedictine Monastery of Pershore in 972. In this Anglo-Saxon text, Broadway is called Bradanwege and its boundaries are described in great detail. The complete copy of the charter may be seen in the British Museum (Facsimile Volume III 30).

By the 11th century the village was already well established and apparently thriving. It is listed in the Domesday Book in Great Domesday folio 175 for Worcestershire as part of the land holdings of the Church of St Mary of Pershore: "The church itself holds Bradeweia. There are 30 hides paying geld. In demesne are 3 ploughs; and a priest and 42 villeins with 20 ploughs. There are 8 slaves. The whole in the time of Edward was worth £12 10s 0d; now £14 10s 0d."

It continued to prosper, becoming a borough by the 13th century. For Broadway this marked a considerable departure from the entirely peasant community that had existed in former times, though the following two centuries saw it decline in the wake of the Black Death. Its fortunes were revived during the late 16th century after the dissolution of the monasteries relieved Pershore Abbey of ownership in 1539. The Crown sold the Manor of Broadway in 1558. There followed three centuries of almost unbroken growth, during which the population increased to about five times its Elizabethan level. As in other Cotswold towns, wealth was based on the wool and cloth trade. In the first half the 19th century Broadway was part of a short-lived Cotswolds silk industry, centred on Blockley, with a water-powered silk mill.

By around 1600 the village had become a busy stagecoach stop on the route from Worcester to London. The village provided all the services that might be needed, including grooms, places of refreshment and extra horses for the steep haul up Fish Hill, a former quarry. As a result, there were once as many as 33 public houses in Broadway compared to the three which exist today.

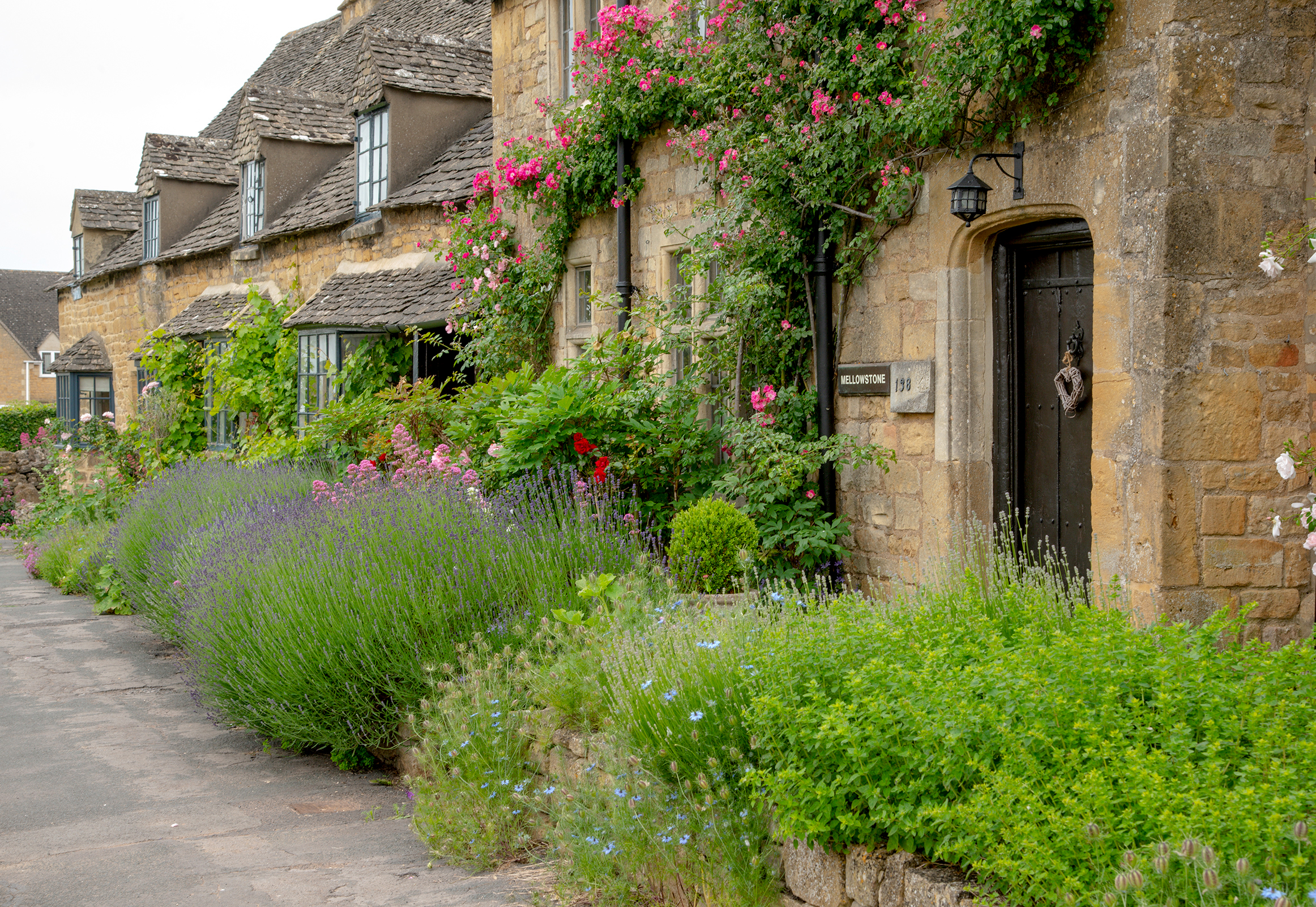
Row of houses of Cotswold stone in Broadway

The road between Evesham and the summit of Fish Hill became a toll road as a result of legislation dated 1728. Tolls were collected at Turnpike House, which can be found (now renamed Pike Cottage) in the Upper High Street. However, the introduction of the railways in Britain in the mid-19th century reduced the passing trade on which Broadway relied. Travel by stagecoach stopped almost immediately with the opening of the railway in Evesham in 1852.

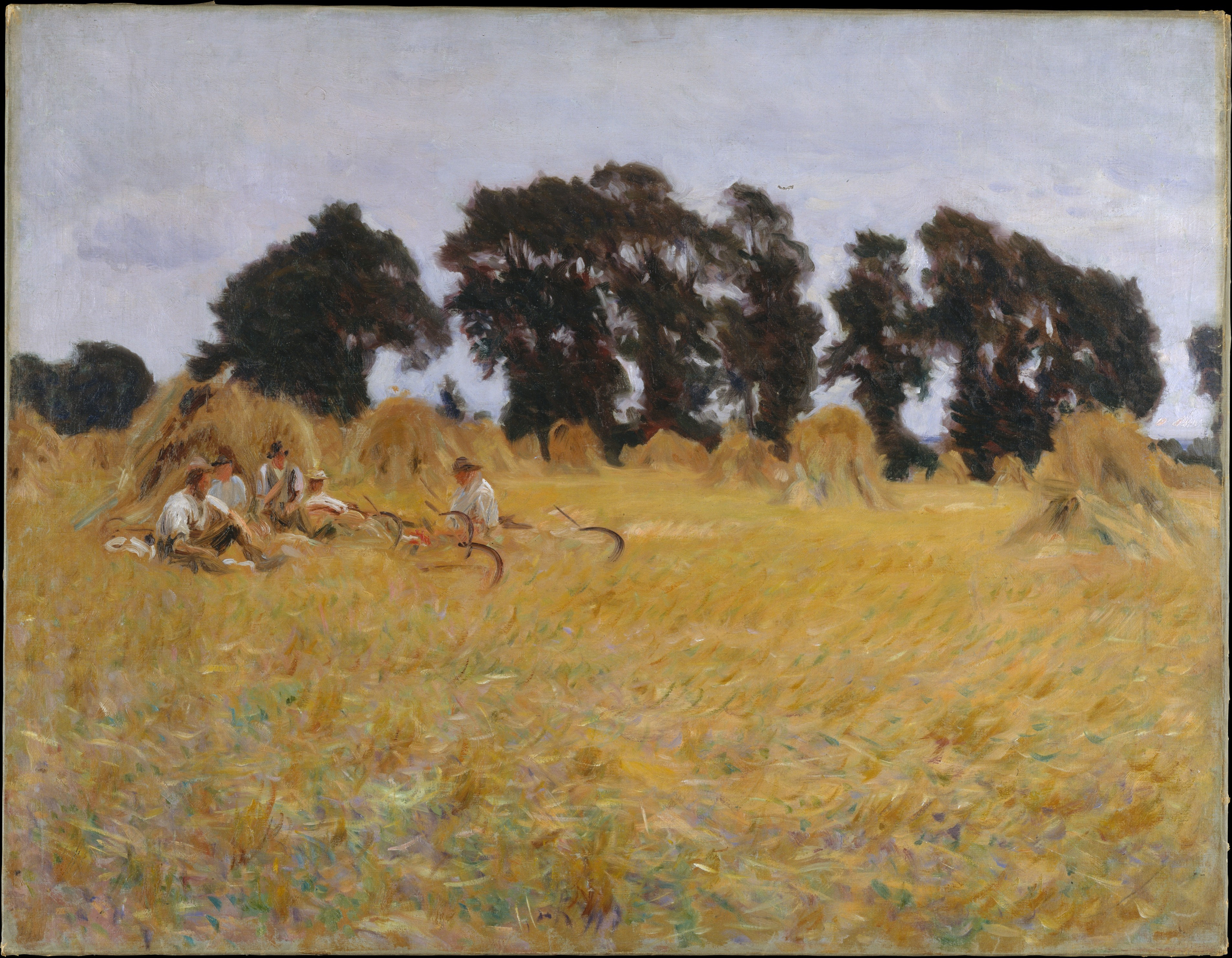
Reapers Resting in a Wheat Field, painted by American impressionist John Singer Sargent near Broadway in 1885

Stripped of its role of staging post, Broadway became a backwater; a haven of peace and tranquillity. Victorian artists and writers were drawn to the village's calm and the famous Arts and Crafts movement made its home in the area. The artists and writers to whom Broadway became home included Edwin Austin Abbey, Mary Anderson, J. M. Barrie, Arthur Blomfield, Elgar, Francis Davis Millet, William Morris, John Singer Sargent and Vaughan Williams.

Blomfield lived at Springfield House and is buried in Broadway.

Millet died in the sinking of the Titanic aged 65 and is commemorated by a memorial at St Eadburgha's Churchyard, Broadway. In 1932 Millet's son Jack donated £120 to St Eadburgha's Church for the construction of lychgates in his father's memory at the churchyard on Snowshill Road.

Broadway is thought (by Sir Steven Runciman (1903–2000), a Cambridge historian who knew Benson well) to have been the model for a fictional Elizabethan village in the Cotswolds, Riseholme, the home of Lucia in the novels of E. F. Benson, before she moved to Tilling (based on Rye in East Sussex).

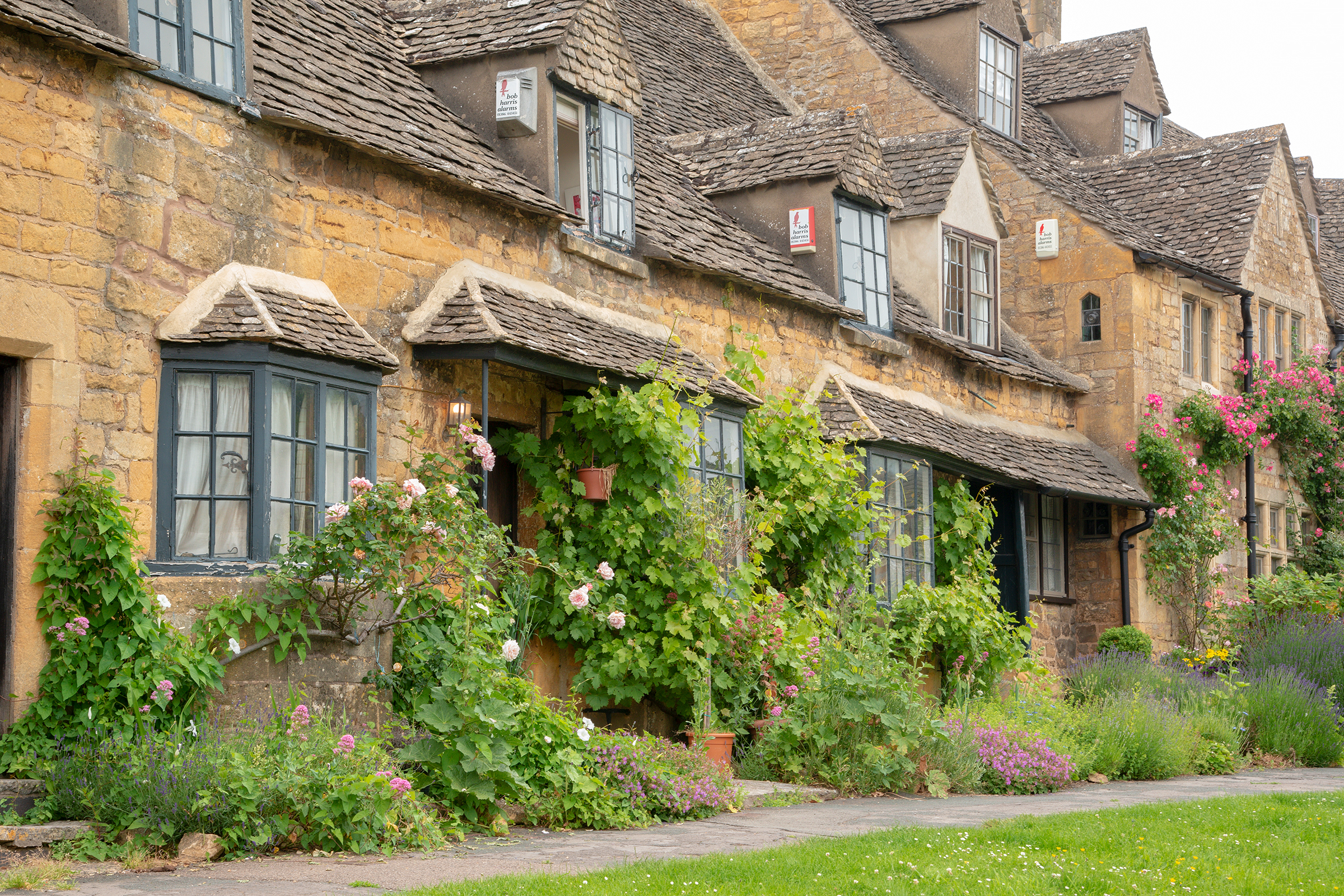
Tourists appreciate the quaint residential properties made of Cotswold stone (oolitic Jurassic limestone).

The arrival of the motor-car at the turn of the 20th century, and the advent of popular tourism, restored Broadway's vitality, placing it now among the most frequently visited of all Cotswold villages. In 1934 J. B. Priestley published his book English Journey, a travelogue in which he re-visits areas of the Cotswolds, including Broadway. He described the Cotswolds as "the most English and the least spoiled of all our countrysides. The truth is that it has no colour that can be described. Even when the sun is obscured and the light is cold, these walls are still faintly warm and luminous, as if they knew the trick of keeping the lost sunlight of centuries glimmering about them."

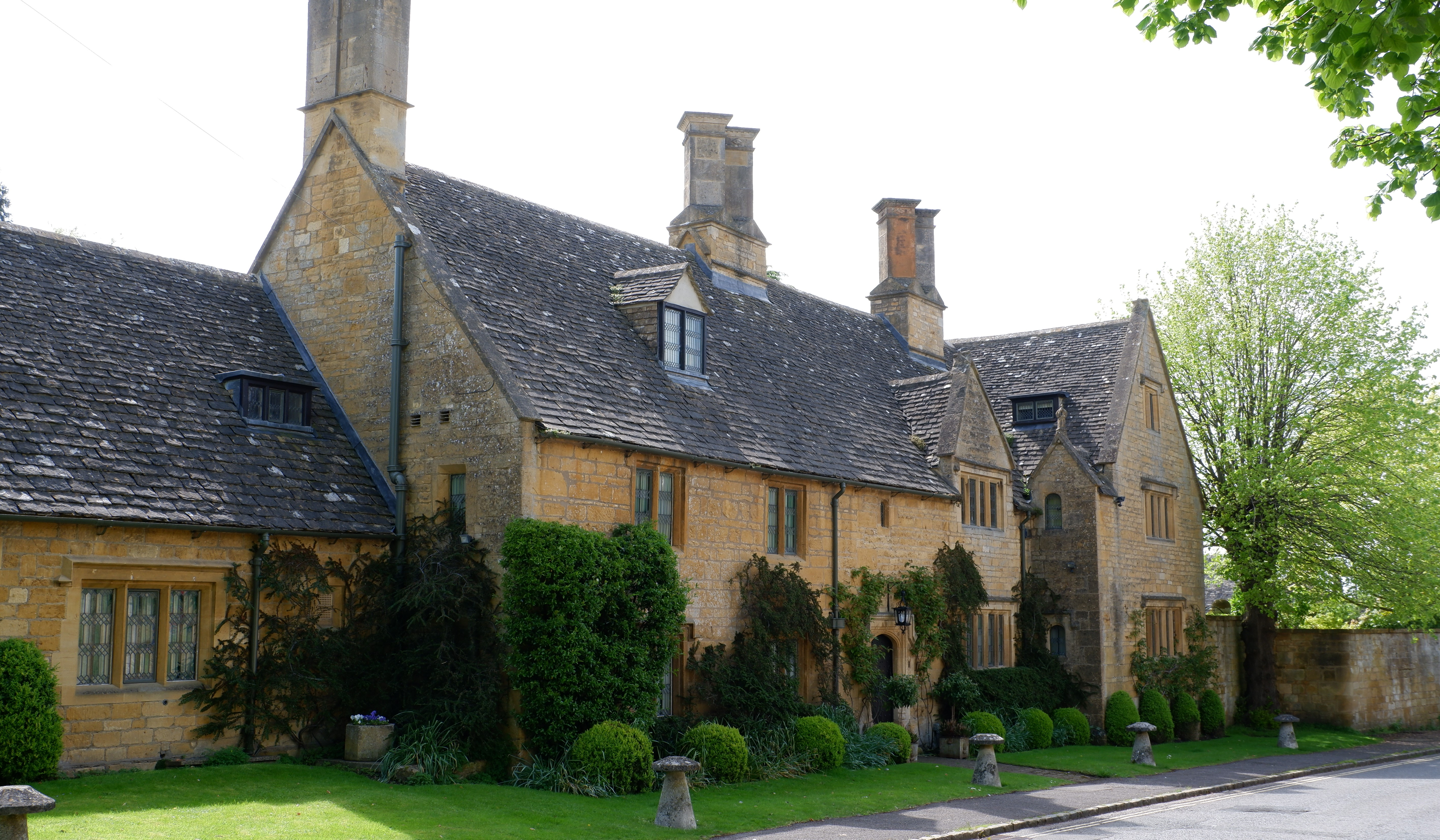
Thomas E. Wells's former estate, Orchard Farm, at 149 High Street

The war memorial on the village green, dating from 1920, marks the deaths of local individuals who died fighting in World War I and World War II.

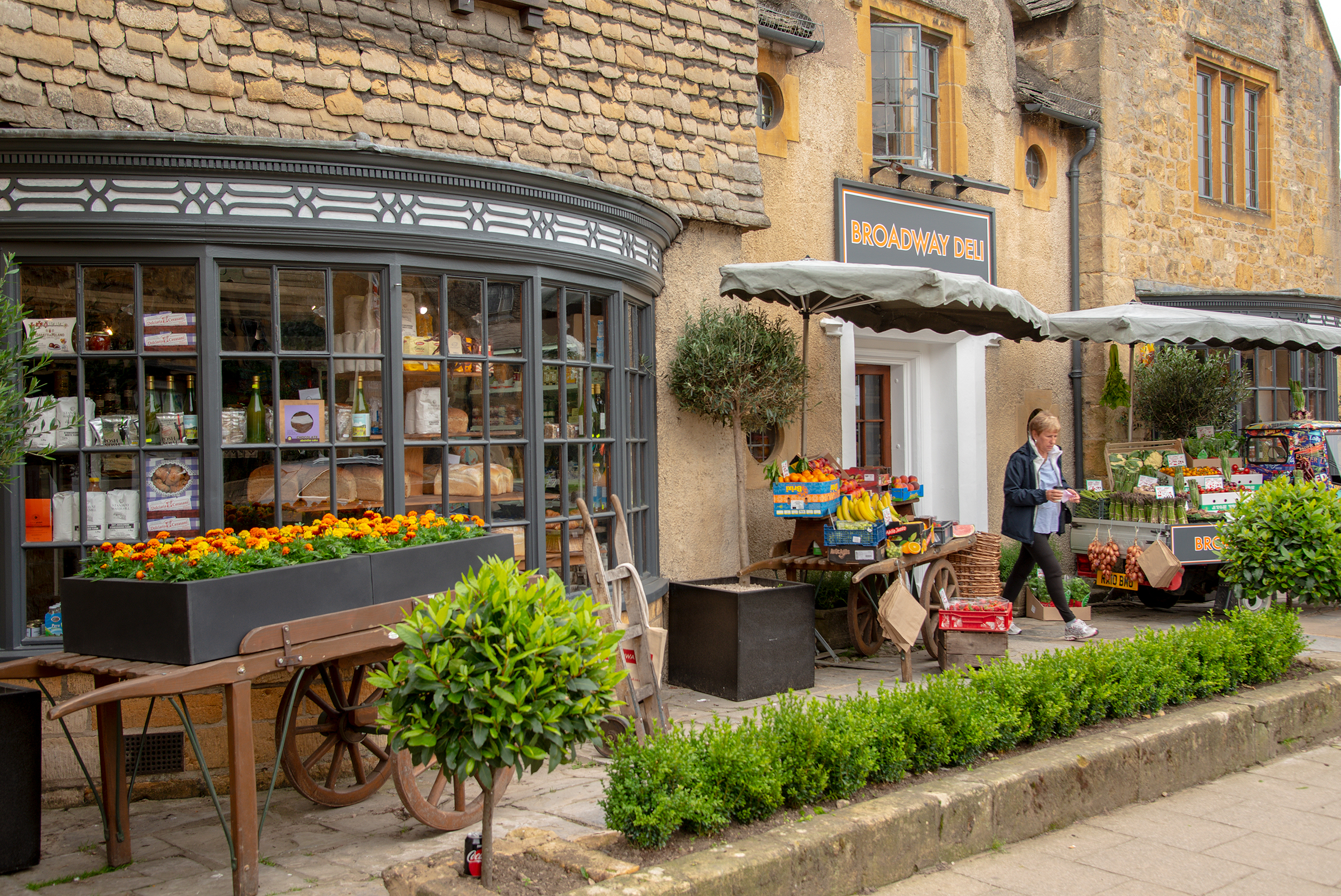
One of the businesses on the High Street

Broadway takes its name from the wide main street, now High Street (one of the longest in England). By the 18th century, it was a toll road and a prominent stagecoach stop. In the beginning the ‘broad way’ probably began as a drove road and may be unusually wide because of the two small streams that used to run each side of the main street; people built on either side of the brooks, and a road formed down the middle. In the winter, the mud from the road was piled up, and in the summer, grass grew on the piles; these verges still remain today. Water used to flow down from the hills and straight through the village then in later years the streams were mostly hidden inside underground pipes, only emerging at occasional ‘dipping’ points. Nowadays, the streams are almost entirely invisible.

=== 1964 mid-air collision ===
BAC Jet Provost XP639 crashed on 12 March 1964 on Fish Hill, after colliding with Jet Provost XR670.

Flt Lt Richard Cox, of Bournemouth, ejected at 100ft in a vertical dive, and suffered a compression fracture.

== Modern times ==
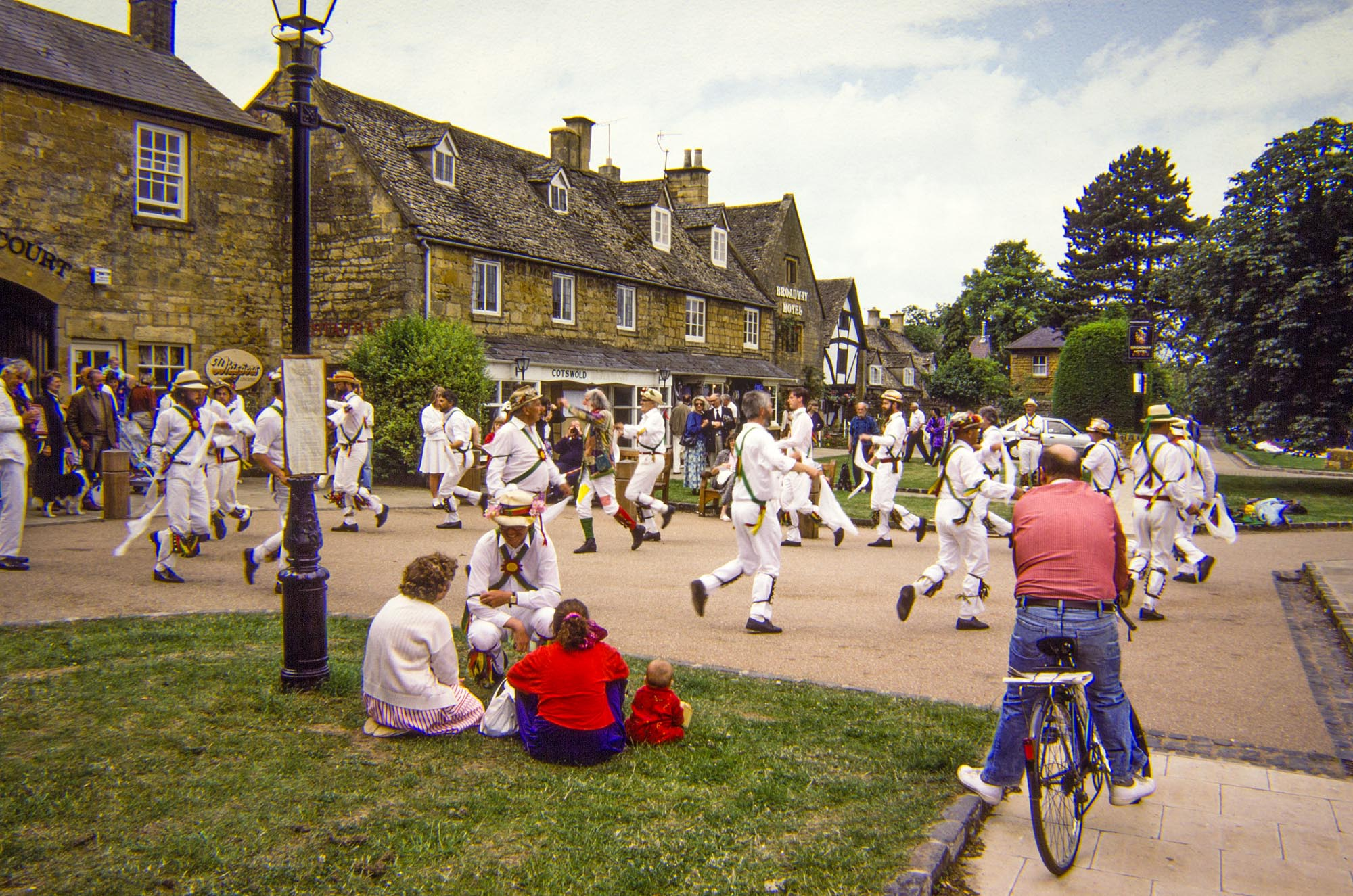
Morris dancers perform on Broadway High Street, 1990.

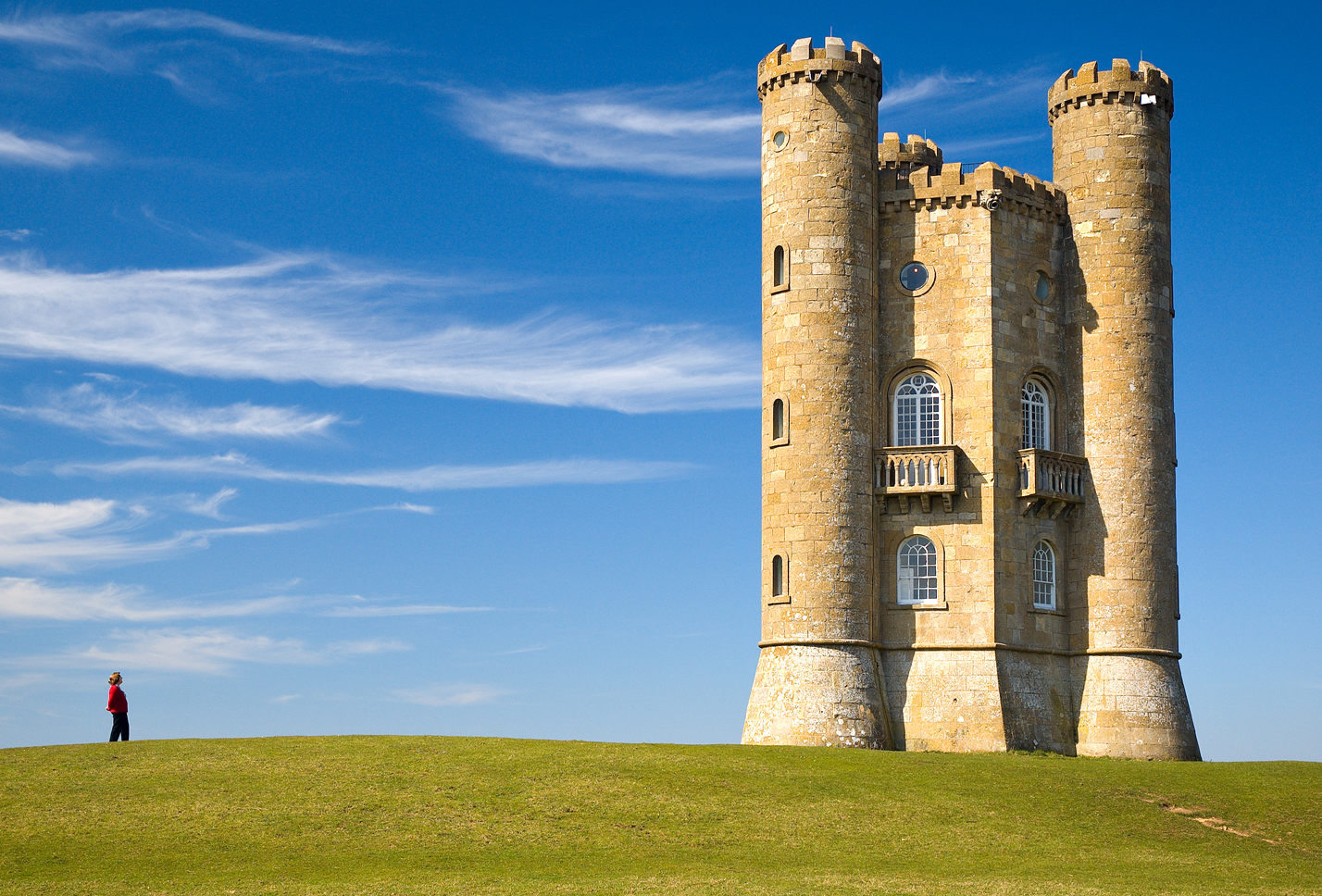
Broadway Tower

Today, Broadway is a centre for arts and antiques. The village's accommodation includes the Broadway Hotel, Russell's "a restaurant with rooms", the 1600s Cotswold inn the Lygon Arms, a caravan site, holiday cottages, bed and breakfast lodges, old pubs including the Swan Inn and Crown & Trumpet, shops, restaurants and tea rooms.

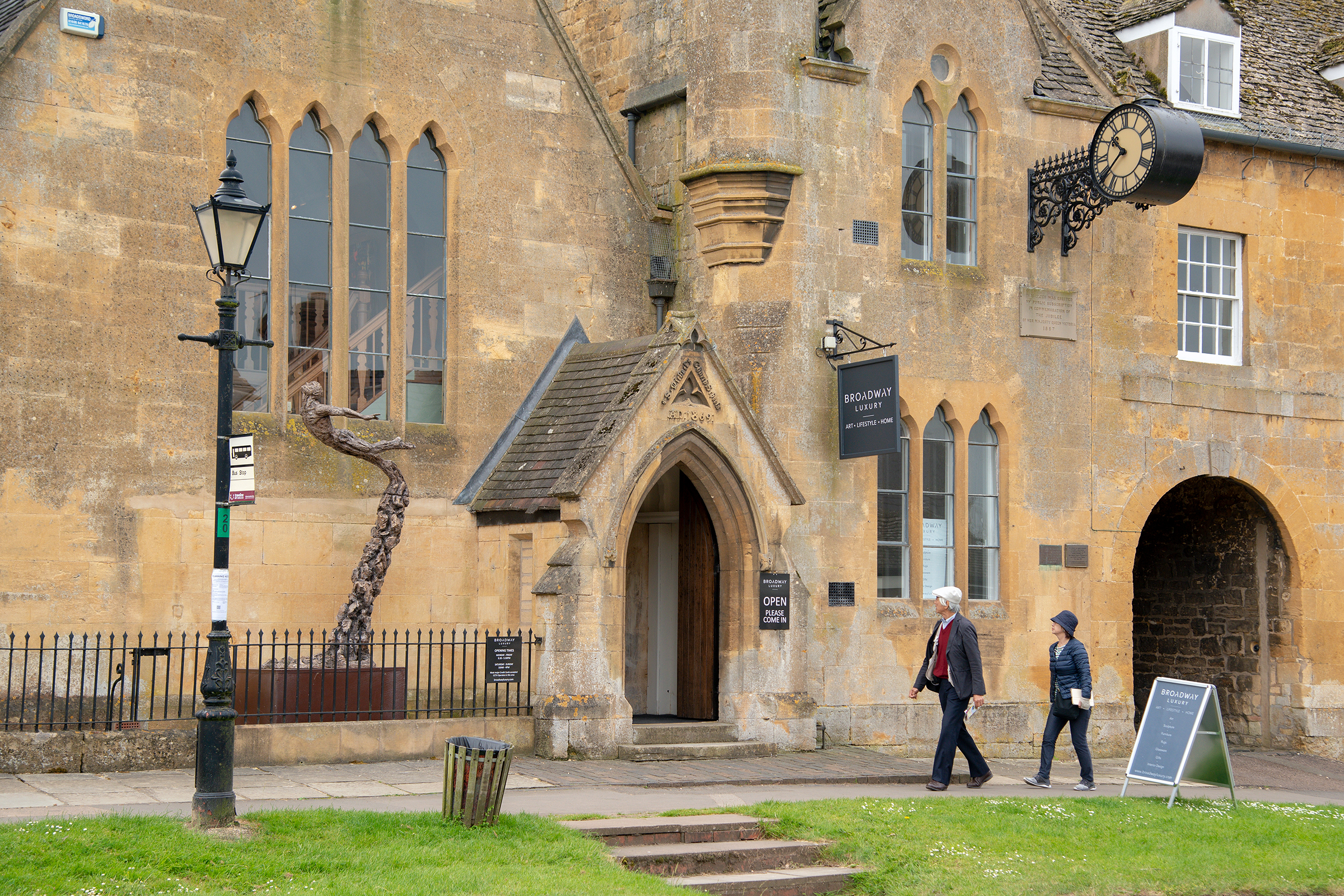
This former school (Grade II Listed) at 67 High St. was part of a shop in 1856 and was enlarged 1869. It again houses a shop.

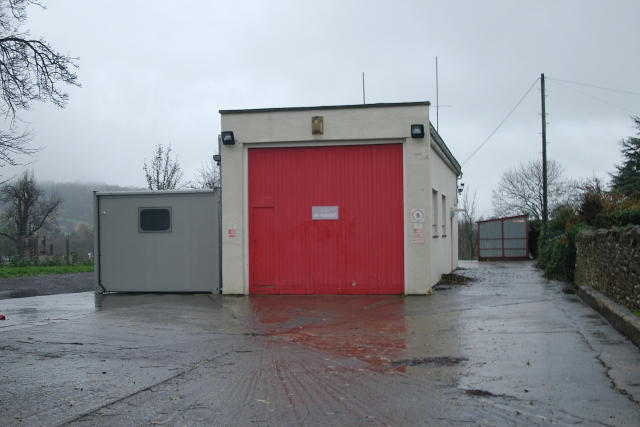
The Village Fire Station tucked off a narrow lane off the high street

Local attractions include the Gordon Russell Design Museum (celebrating the work of the 20th-century furniture maker Sir Gordon Russell MC), the Ashmolean Museum Broadway displaying objects from the 17th to the 21st centuries in 'Tudor House' a former 17th-century coaching inn, the 65-foot-high (20 m) Broadway Tower on its hilltop site in the Broadway Tower Country Park, Chipping Campden, Snowshill village, Snowshill Manor (owned by the National Trust), horse riding and, for the many ramblers, the Cotswold Way.

Country Life magazine provided these insights into the importance of the Russell museum. "In 1903 "Sydney Bolton Russell [Gordon's father] bought the inn on the main street, The Lygon Arms, restoring it ... Originally a craftsman in the Arts-and-Crafts mould (although he was later frowned-upon by purists for his willingness to increase output by using machines), Gordon Russell opened a workshop in the village."

The village is overlooked by Broadway Hill, the highest point in the northern Cotswolds at 1,024 ft (312 m) above sea level, which is popular with hill walkers.

== Churches ==
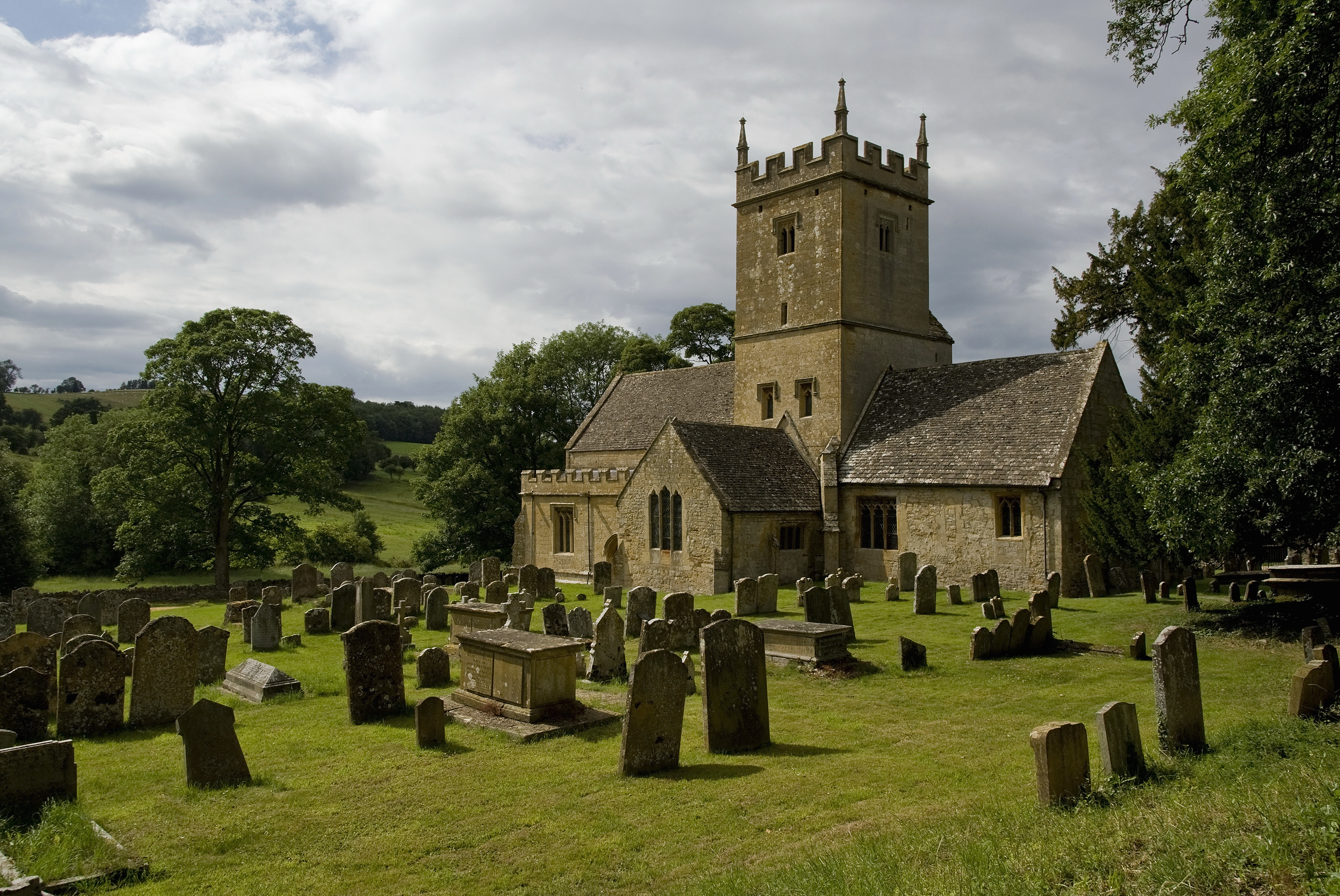
The Church of St Eadburgha

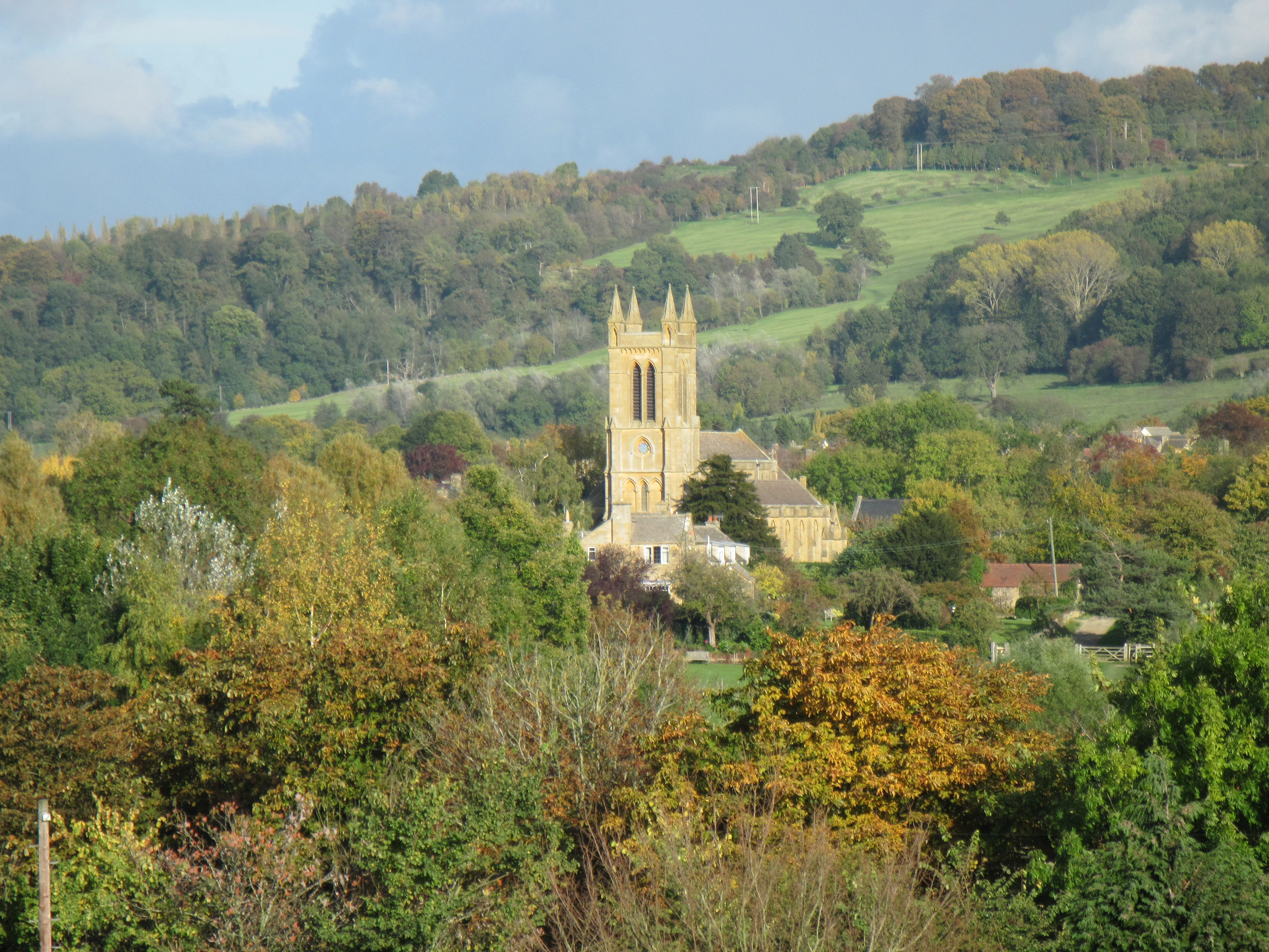
St Michael & All Angels' Church, Broadway

The original parish church of Broadway actually lies almost a mile outside of the village. Nevertheless, the Church of St Eadburgha has been a Christian place of worship since the 12th century and continues to be a significant aspect of village life. The dedication of a Christian church to Eadburgha is not common. Eadburgha was the granddaughter of Alfred the Great. The story is told that as a child Eadburgha was asked to choose between receiving jewels or her own Bible, she chose the Bible.

The Church of St Eadburgha is listed as Grade I by English Heritage (Building ID: 400976). The current structure was built c. 1400 but there are elements that remain of the original 12th-century building.

The main Broadway parish church is now St. Michael and All Angels, which is listed as Grade II. It was built in 1839 within the village of Broadway itself. It has a fine wood carved pulpit transferred from St Eadburgha.

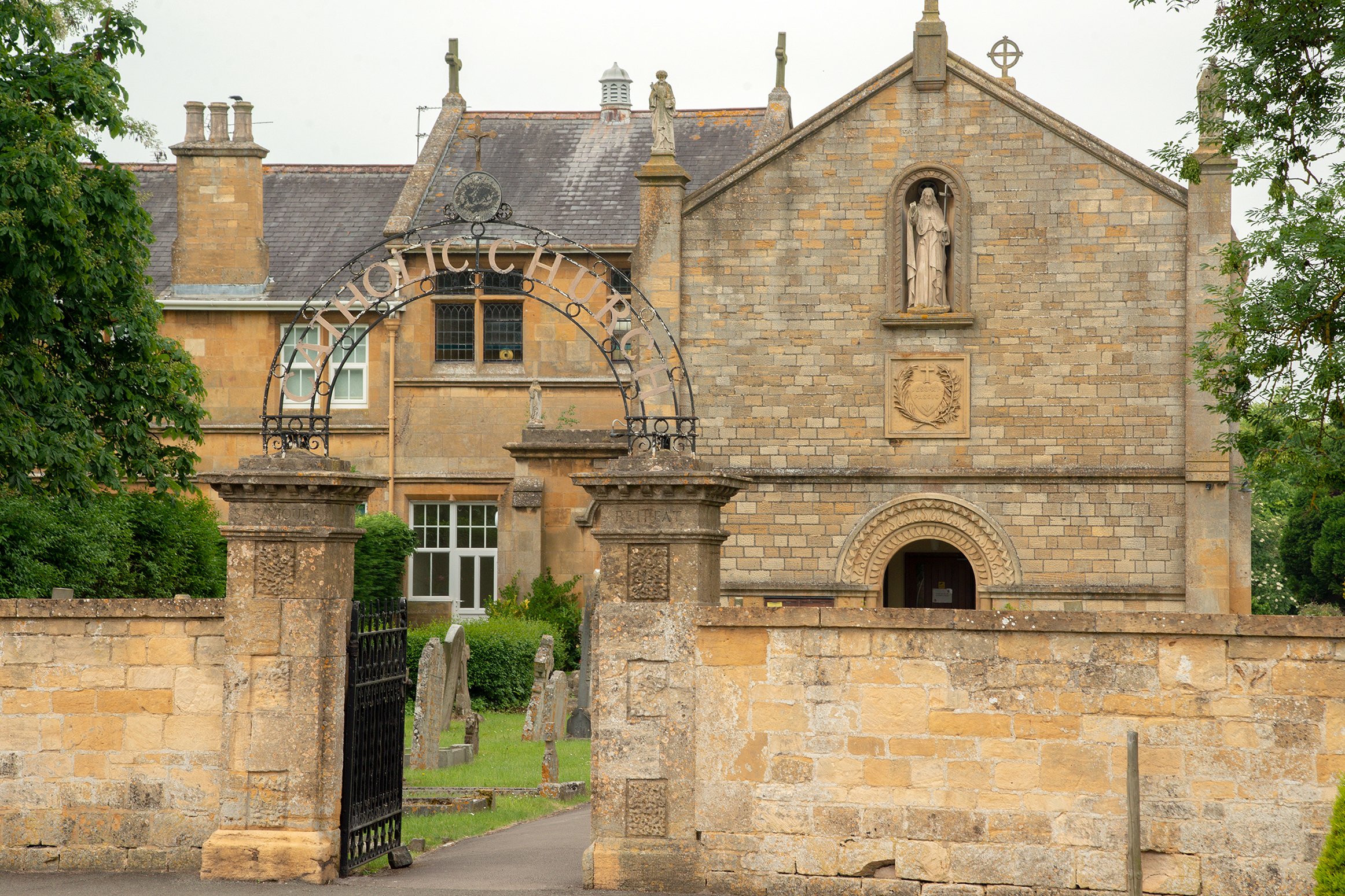
Exterior of St Saviour's RC church

The Roman Catholic place of worship is St Saviour's which is listed as Grade II (since 2016). The building was constructed as a Benedictine monastery chapel in 1828–1829; it was extended and altered in the 1850s when a school was added, and the interior was modified slightly several times afterwards. The property was converted to a parish church in 2000. The individual primarily responsible for the original development of this facility was Dom John Augustine Birdsall OSB.

== Broadway railway station ==
Broadway was once served by a railway line, a relative latecomer in British railway history, opened in 1904 by the Great Western Railway and running from Stratford-upon-Avon to Cheltenham, part of a main line from Birmingham to the South West and South Wales. Broadway railway station along with almost all others on this section closed in 1960; though passenger services continued until 1968, and goods continued until 1976 when a derailment south of Toddington damaged the line. It was decided not to bring the section back into use and by the early 1980s, it had been dismantled.

Thus, although Broadway has a railway station site and a Station Road, it is no longer served by National Rail services. The nearest railway stations are Evesham, Honeybourne and Moreton-in-Marsh, on the main line train service running between Hereford and London Paddington station and on the Cotswold Line between Oxford and Worcester.

=== Heritage railways ===
The 15-mile stretch between Broadway Station and Cheltenham Racecourse has since been reconstructed and reopened as the Gloucestershire Warwickshire Railway.

The line was extended northwards to the village, and Broadway is its current northern terminus, opening in 2018. Though nothing remained of the original Broadway railway station, the Broadway Area Group of the Gloucestershire Warwickshire Railway Trust received planning permission to reconstruct the station. Work started in 2009, rebuilding the platforms, signal box, railway station buildings and footbridge.

The Trust completed the laying of tracks on 23 December 2017, with a test train arriving at Broadway later the same day, and had passenger services running from 30 March 2018.

In addition, the now disbanded Stratford upon Avon and Broadway Railway Society aimed to re-open the northern part of the line from Broadway to Stratford-upon-Avon. This was a long-term project and, initially, the society concentrated on the short stretch from Honeybourne to Long Marston.

Broadway Railway Station

Nonetheless, reaching Stratford-upon-Avon (via Honeybourne) remains the GWR Trust's main dream and official goal for the future, although no longer easily achievable, owing to a road obstruction between Stratford-upon-Avon Racecourse and the station itself.

Following the Cotswold Way
Towards; Bath	Towards; Chipping Campden
19 km (12 miles) to Winchcombe	9 km (5.6 miles) to Chipping Campden
