= Ted Cullinan =

English architect (1931–2019)

Ted Cullinan CBE RA RDI FRIBA HonFRIAS
- Born: Edward Horder Cullinan; 17 July 1931; London, England
- Died: 11 November 2019 (aged 88)
- Occupation: Architect

Edward Horder Cullinan CBE RA RDI FRIBA HonFRIAS (17 July 1931 – 11 November 2019) was an English architect.

== Life ==
Born in central London to Joy, an artist mother, and Edward, a doctor, Cullinan was educated at Ampleforth College, Queens' College, Cambridge, the Architectural Association, where he was in an intake of students under Sir Frederick Gibberd who went on to make a significant contribution to post-war design and architecture in the UK; Sir Philip Dowson, Richard Burton, Ray Leigh, Sir Colin St John Wilson and Julian Keable. Roderick Gradidge and Michael Blower were also his contemporaries. After the AA, he studied at the University of California, Berkeley before working for Denys Lasdun where he designed the student residences for the University of East Anglia.

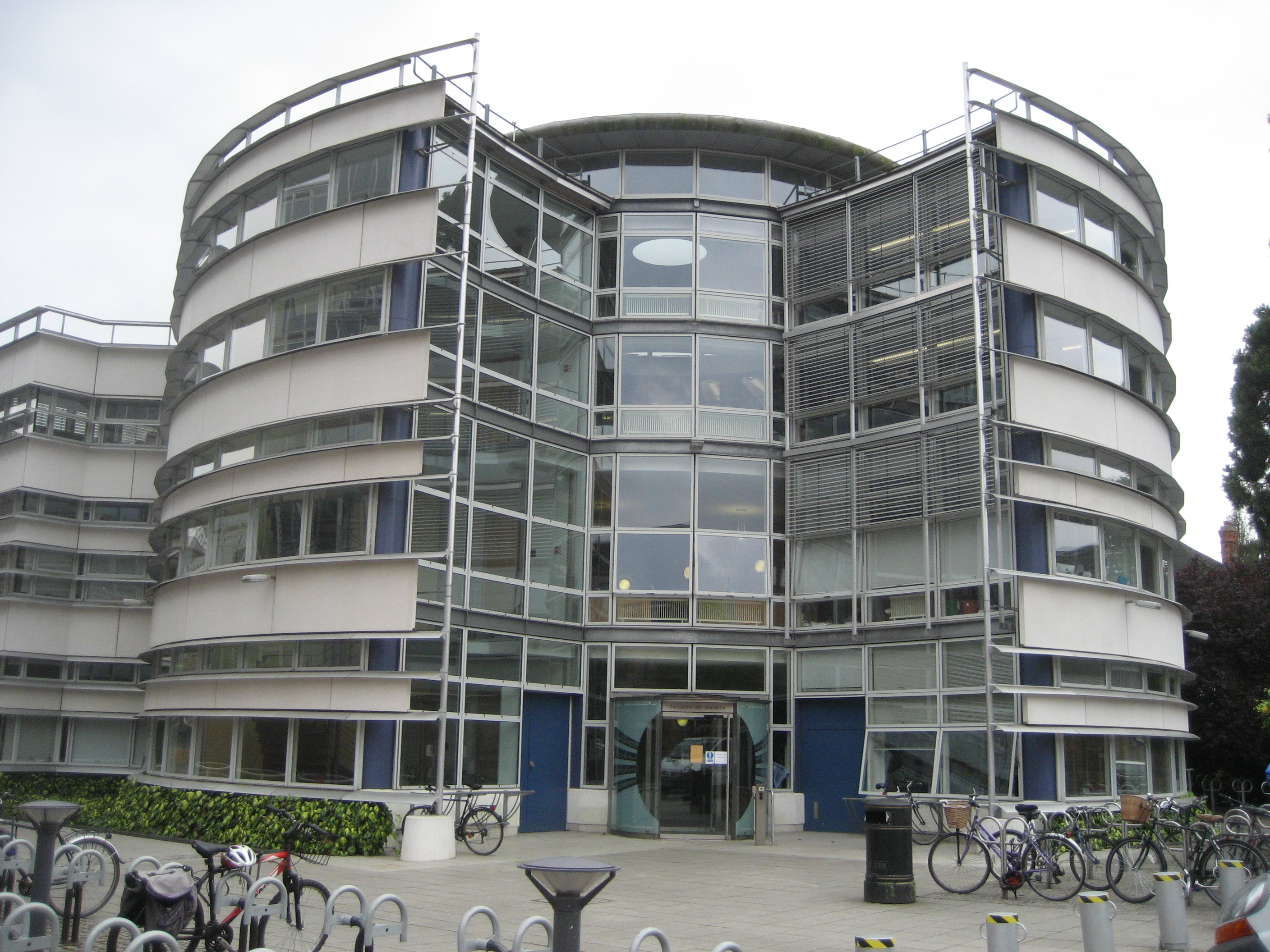
Divinity Faculty, University of Cambridge

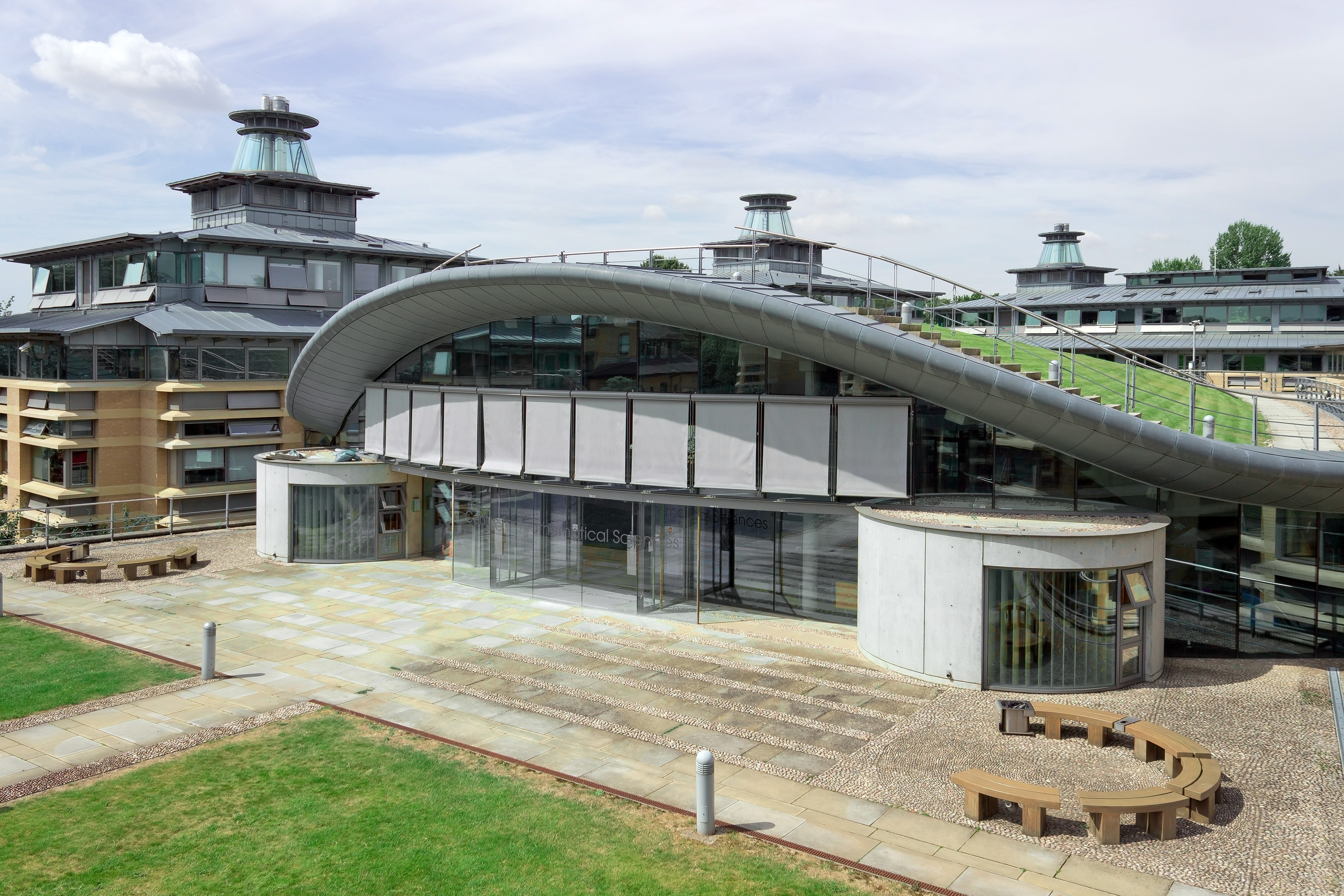
Centre for Mathematical Sciences, Cambridge

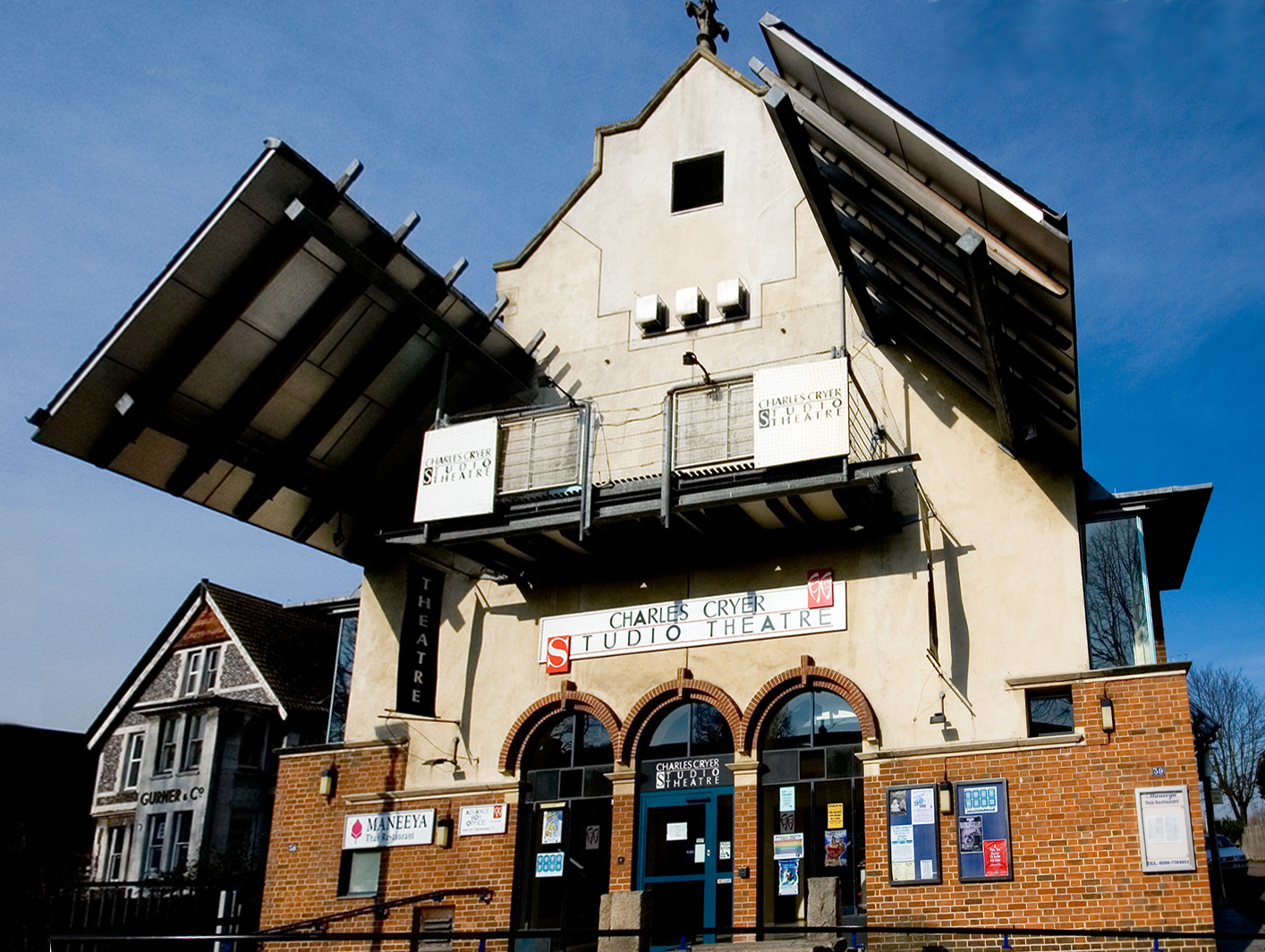
Charles Cryer Theatre, Carshalton

Cullinan founded his own practice in 1959. The employee-owned business, Cullinan Studio (formerly Edward Cullinan Architects), was founded in 1965. Notable projects include the Charles Cryer Theatre, Carshalton (completed in 1991), the Fountains Abbey Visitor Centre (completed 1992), the Centre for Mathematical Sciences (Cambridge) (completed 2003), the Weald and Downland Gridshell (2002, nominated for the Stirling Prize) and the new library at Fitzwilliam College, Cambridge (opened 2010).

Cullinan was a visiting professor at the University of Nottingham, and was awarded four other professorships at The Bartlett (1978–9), Sheffield University (1985–87), Massachusetts Institute of Technology (1985), and the University of Edinburgh (1987–90).

Cullinan was appointed Commander of the Order of the British Empire (CBE) in the 1987 New Year Honours. In 2008, he was awarded the Royal Gold Medal of the Royal Institute of British Architects, and appointed a Royal Designer for Industry (RDI) in 2010.

National Life Stories conducted an oral history interview (C467/93) with Edward Cullinan in 2010 for its Architects Lives' collection held by the British Library.

Cullinan married Rosalind Yeates in 1961, and the couple built their own house in Camden Mews, London, by hand. They had three children: Emma, Kate and Tom.

== Family connections ==
His grandfather was Thomas Horder, 1st Baron Horder, who was a Royal Physician.
