= Charles Paget Wade =

English architect and collector

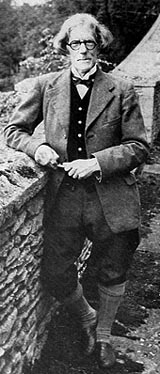
- Charles Paget Wade in Snowshill Manor
- Born: 1883; Shortlands, Kent, England
- Died: 1956 (aged 72–73); Evesham, Worcestershire, England
- Occupation: Architect
- Practice: Parker and Unwin (1907-1911)

Charles Paget Wade (1883 – 28 June 1956) was an English architect, artist-craftsman and poet. Today he is perhaps best remembered for the eclectic collection he amassed during his life, a collection which can be seen at Snowshill Manor, his former home in the village of Snowshill, Gloucestershire, which he gave to the National Trust in 1951.

== Life ==
Wade was the son of Paget Augustus and Amy Wade, who owned several sugar plantations in the West Indies. Wade's paternal grandmother, Mary Jones, was a black woman whom his grandfather married in 1855 in St Kitts before moving the family to England by 1861. Their children and grandchildren, including Charles, were among the largest landowners in St Kitts.

When Wade's father died in 1911, Wade inherited a share in the family sugar business, leaving him independently wealthy.

Wade married in 1946. His spouse, Mary McEwan Gore Graham, was working in the nearby village of Broadway during World War II when she first visited Snowshill Manor in 1945. After the marriage they spent increasing amounts of time at their house in the West Indies.

== Career and collecting ==
From an early age, Wade wanted to become an architect. After he qualified as an Associate of the Royal Institute of British Architects in 1907, he went to work for Raymond Unwin, one of the founders of the architectural partnership of Parker and Unwin, major proponents of the Arts and Crafts movement. Among the design projects he worked on while at Unwin and Parker's firm was the visionary planned community in north London, the Hampstead Garden Suburb. Wade later turned to one of his Unwin and Parker colleagues, M.H. Baillie Scott, for help in designing the gardens at Snowshill Manor.

In 1919, after service in France during World War I, Wade purchased the estate at Snowshill, which he restored – first the manor house, then the gardens – over the next four years. Having started collecting at the age of 7, Wade eventually built up a collection of more than 22,000 items of furniture, clothing, paintings, and many other pieces which reflected his interest in colour, design and good craftsmanship. He housed the collection in the manor house at Snowshill, choosing to live in a small cottage in the garden. He continued to add to his collection over the years. The objects he collected included musical instruments, clocks, bicycles, and 26 sets of samurai armour.

During his lifetime, Wade gained some renown for his creation of a miniature 18th century Cornish fishing village, which he named Wolf's Cove. Wade rendered its houses, harbour, fishing boats and gear, and inhabitants, in 1:10 to 1:12 scale, from wood, straw, plaster, textiles and other materials. Over time, he expanded Wolf's Cove such that it attracted hundreds of visitors a year, including Virginia Woolf, Queen Mary, and the poet John Betjeman.

Wade gave the estate to the National Trust in 1951. He died in 1956 during a visit to England and is buried in the village churchyard with other members of his family. In addition to the many drawings and paintings he produced for his own interest, Wade also illustrated the travel guide Bruges by Mary Stratton (1914) and The Spirit of the House by Kate Murray (1915).
