= Reapers Resting in a Wheat Field =

Painting by John Singer Sargent

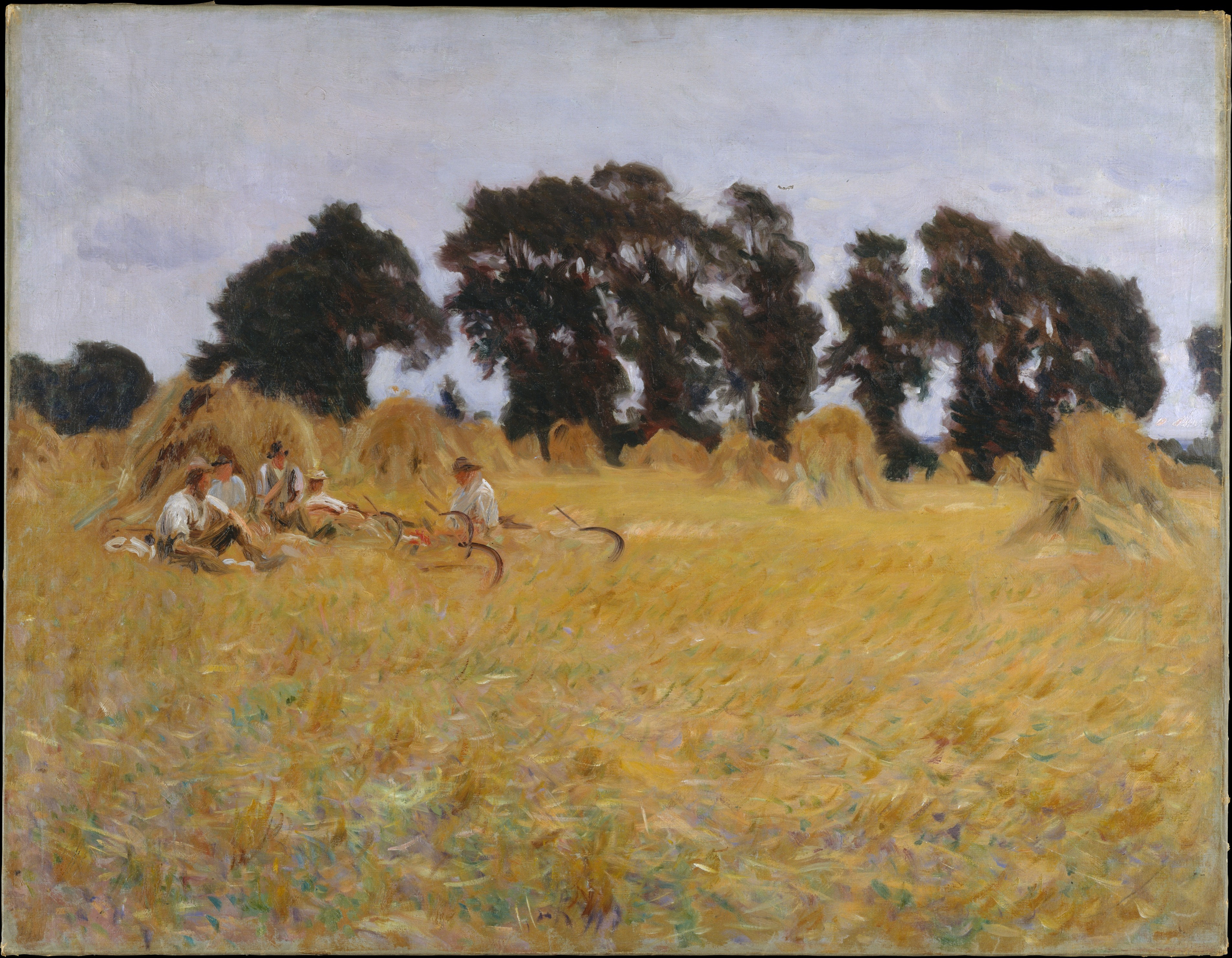
- Artist: John Singer Sargent
- Year: 1885
- Medium: Oil on canvas
- Dimensions: 71.1 cm × 91.4 cm (28.0 in × 36.0 in)
- Location: Metropolitan Museum of Art

Reapers Resting in a Wheat Field is a late 19th-century painting by American impressionist John Singer Sargent. Done in oil on canvas, the painting a scene set in a wheat field near the village of Broadway, Worcestershire.

== Description ==
The painting depicts a group of English wheat farmers resting in their field during harvest. The titular reapers are seated in a semicircle, with their sickles stuck in the ground. As is evident by the stacks of wheat in the field, the harvest is well underway. The sky in the background is slightly overcast, while a brace of trees provides a stark, green backdrop that contrasts the yellow field of wheat. Aspects of the painting consist of long, wavy brushstrokes, a style in tune with Sargent's impressionist proclivities.

Sargent spent the fall of 1885 in the Cotswolds of Southern England, where the image was painted.

== See also ==
- List of works by John Singer Sargent
