= Snowshill Manor =

Historic house in Snowshill, Gloucestershire, England

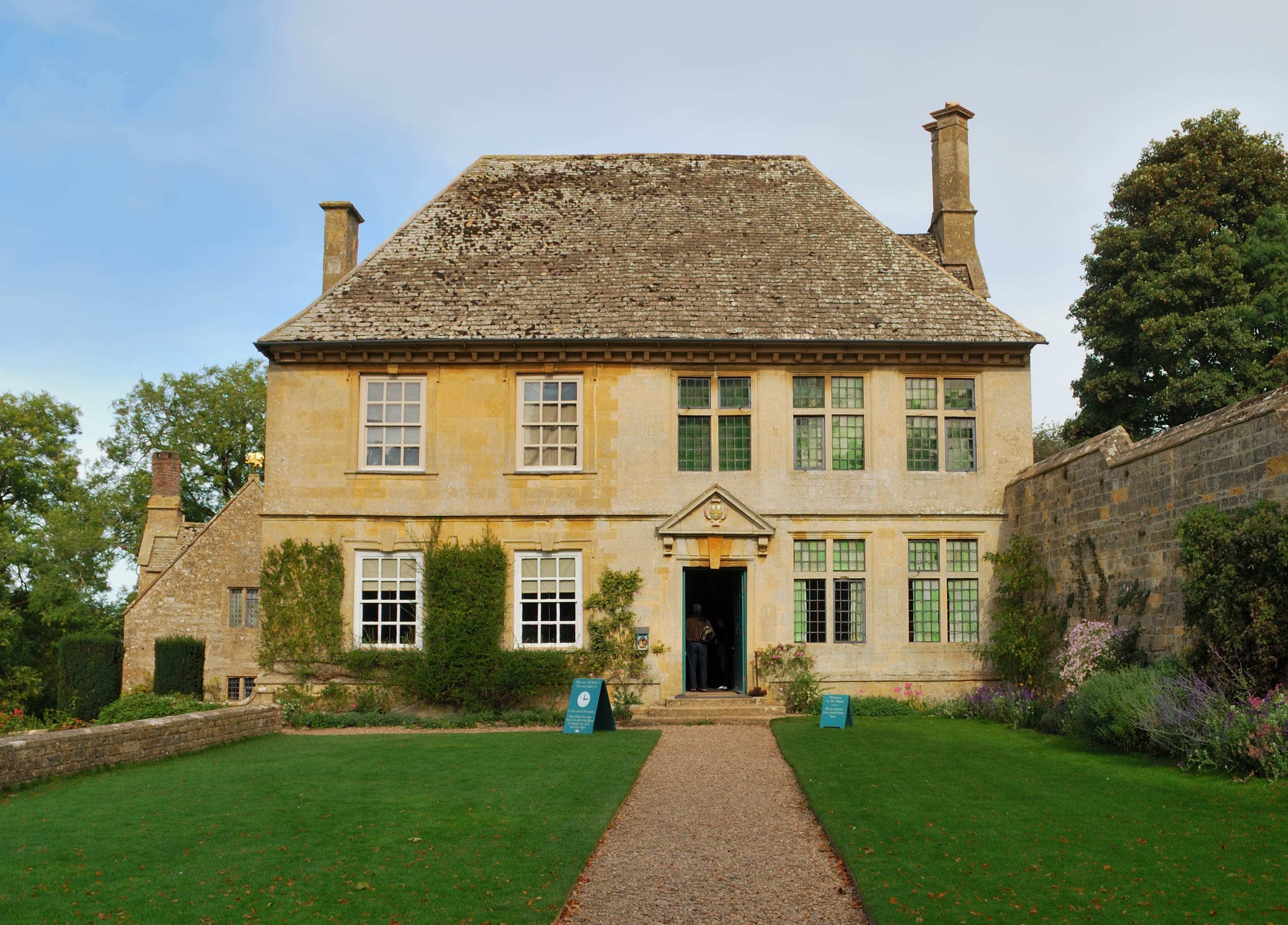
- Snowshill Manor from the front
- Interactive map of Snowshill Manor
- Location: 52.0029°N 1.8605°W
- Built: Late 16th Century
- Restored: 1919
- Restored by: Charles Wade
- Owner: National Trust

Listed Building – Grade II*
- Official name: Snowshill Manor
- Designated: 4 July 1960
- Reference no.: 1340081

National Register of Historic Parks and Gardens
- Official name: Snowshill Manor
- Designated: 28 February 1986
- Reference no.: 1000781

Snowshill Manor is a National Trust property located in the village of Snowshill, Gloucestershire, United Kingdom. It is a sixteenth-century country house, best known for its twentieth-century owner, Charles Paget Wade, an eccentric who amassed an enormous collection of objects that interested him. He gave the property to the National Trust in 1951, and his collection is still housed there.

== Manor house ==
The property is a typical Cotswold manor house, made from local stone; the main part of the house dates from the 16th century. It is a Grade II* listed building, having been so designated since 4 July 1960. Also listed are the brewhouse, the dovecote, some of the garden buildings, the wall and gate-piers, and the group of four Manor Cottages.

== History ==
Snowshill Manor was given to Winchcombe Abbey in 821 by King Coenwulf of Mercia. Two hundred and sixty four years later, the village and Manor were listed in the Domesday Book of 1086 as Snawesille, property of the Abbey of Saint Mary of Winchcombe. The Manor remained the property of the Abbey until the Dissolution of the Monasteries in 1539 when it was confiscated by King Henry VIII, who included the Manor in his dowry to his last queen, Catherine Parr, in 1543.

The earliest surviving part of the Manor, the rooms named and now known as Dragon, Nadir, Ann's, Music and Seraphim by Charles Paget Wade, was built around 1550 and it is probable that this section of the Manor was joined to a contemporaneous building to the south, which was later demolished. In the 1600s the Manor was again extended southwards and attic rooms added. In the early part of the 18th century the house was owned by one William Sambach, who added extra rooms on the south-west corner in about 1720. He also added a new main door in the south front, placing the Sambach coat of arms in the pediment above it, which is now the main entrance to the house. After several further changes of owner, John Small of Clapham took over the property, being the first of a series of absentee landlords: for the next 150 years the house was occupied by tenant farmers, until its purchase in 1919 by Charles Paget Wade.

Wade was an architect, artist-craftsman, collector, poet and heir to the family fortune. He restored the property, living in the small cottage in the garden and using the Manor house as a home for his collection of objects. By the time of his death he had amassed over 22,000 objects. He gave the property and the contents of this collection to the National Trust in 1951.

== Collections ==
The house contains an eclectic collection of thousands of objects, gathered over the years by Charles Paget Wade, whose motto was "Let nothing perish". The collection includes toys, Samurai armour, musical instruments, and clocks. Today, the main attraction of the house is perhaps the display of Wade's collection. From 1900 until 1951, when he gave the Manor to the National Trust, Wade amassed an enormous and eclectic collection of objects reflecting his interest in craftsmanship. The objects in the collection include 26 suits of Japanese samurai armour dating from the 17th and 19th centuries, bicycles, toys, musical instruments, and more.

== Priest's House ==
Wade was an eccentric man and lived in the Priest's House while housing his collection in the manor. It is said to be haunted by a monk, and by the ghost of a young woman forced in 1604 to marry against her will in one of the upstairs rooms.

== Garden ==
The garden at Snowshill was laid out by Wade, in collaboration with Arts and Crafts movement architect, M. H. Baillie Scott, between 1920 and 1923. Their elaborate layout resembles a series of outside rooms seen as an extension to the house. Features include terraces and ponds, and the gardens demonstrate Wade's fascination with colours and scents. As well as formal beds, the gardens include an ancient dovecote, a model village, kitchen garden, orchards and small fields with sheep.

=== Wolf's Cove model village ===
This model village was originally built by Wade, in 1907, in the garden of his Lodgings in Hampstead. It was originally called 'Fladbury', but renamed to Wolf's Cove when he moved and expanded it in the late 1920's. It is a 1/2" scale model of a Cornish fishing village, centred round a harbour, with pubs, cottages and a railway.
