= Snowshill =

Village in Gloucestershire, England

Coordinates: 52°00′N 1°51′W

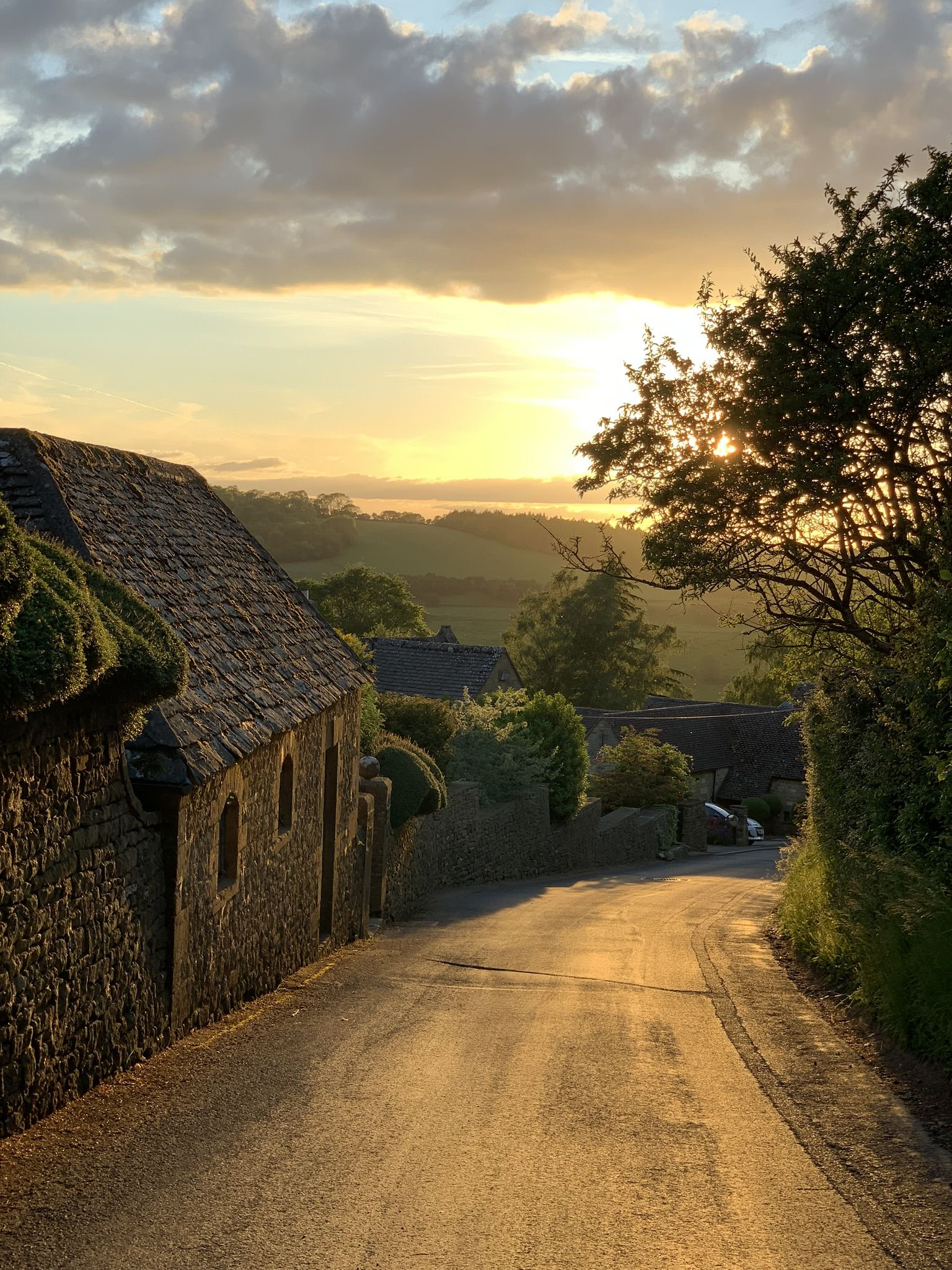
- Snowshill at Sunset

- Location within Gloucestershire
- Population: 164 (2011 Census)
- District: Tewkesbury
- Shire county: Gloucestershire
- Region: South West
- Country: England
- Sovereign state: United Kingdom
- Post town: Broadway
- Postcode district: WR12
- Police: Gloucestershire
- Fire: Gloucestershire
- Ambulance: South Western
- UK Parliament: Tewkesbury

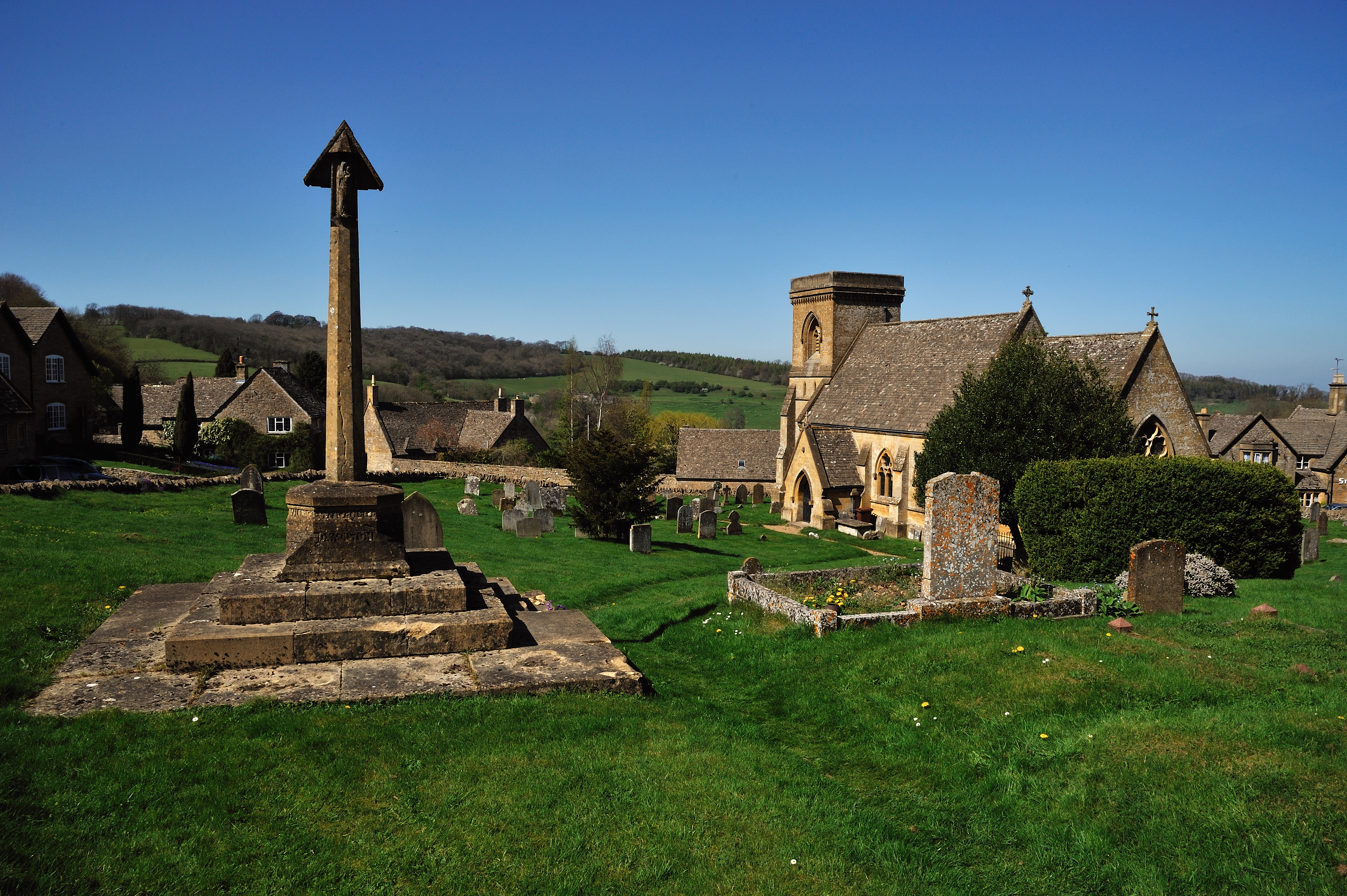
Snowshill, showing the War Memorial in the Churchyard

Snowshill (locally /ˈsnoʊzəl/ SNOH-zəl, /ˈsnɒzəl/ SNOZ-əl) is a small Cotswolds village and civil parish in Gloucestershire, England, located near Broadway, Worcestershire. The population taken at the 2011 census was 164.

== Prehistoric history ==
An important early Bronze Age hoard was found outside Snowshill in the late nineteenth century. Excavated from a barrow in 1881, it includes a picrite battle-axe and bronze pin, dagger and spear-head. Dated to between 2100 and 1600 BC, it is now in the British Museum's collection.

== Snowshill Manor ==
Snowshill is best known for nearby Snowshill Manor, a National Trust property open to the public. The manor house contains an unusual collection of furniture, musical instruments, craft tools, toys, clocks, bicycles and armour, all collected by architect and craftsman Charles Paget Wade between 1900 and 1951. His Arts and Crafts-style gardens are arranged in an eccentric combination of terraces and ponds forming outdoor rooms, with bright colours and delightful scents.

== Gallery ==
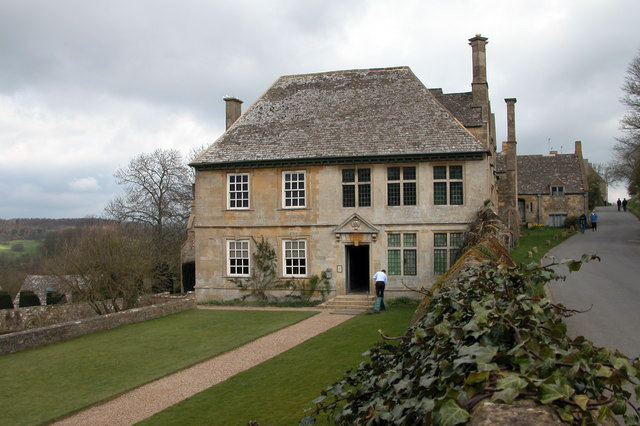
Snowshill Manor

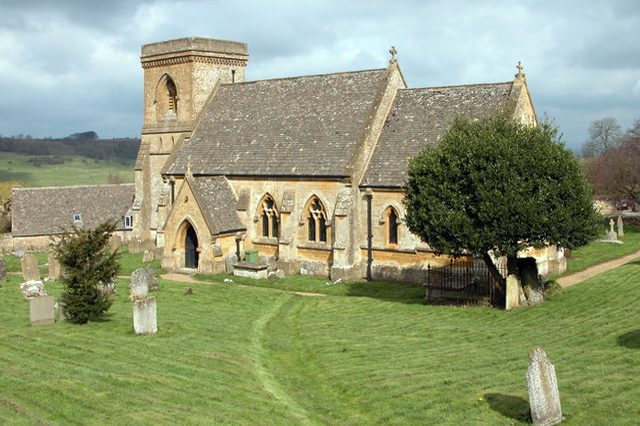
Church of St. Barnabas

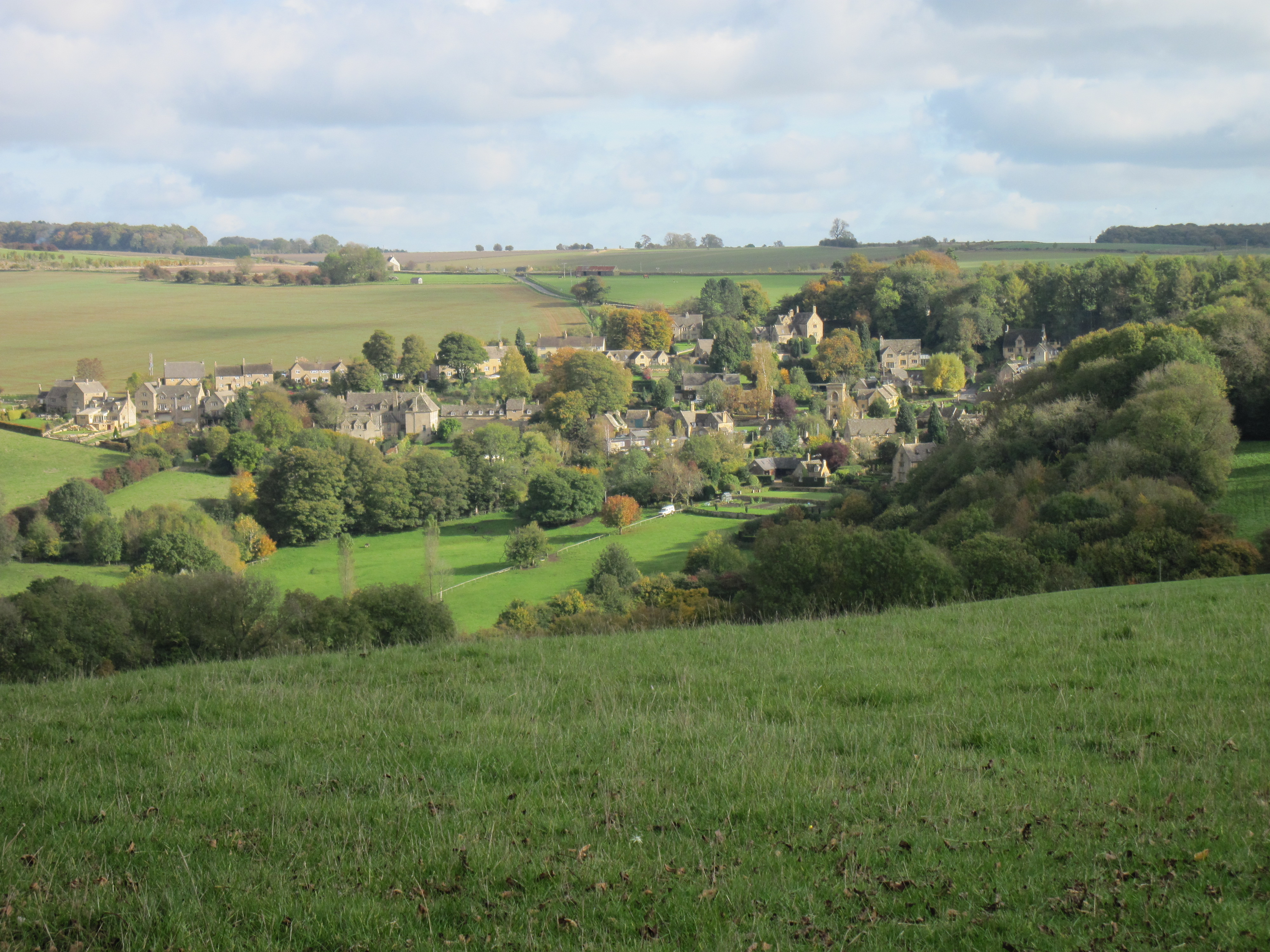
Snowshill
