= Landscape detailing =

Method of landscape design

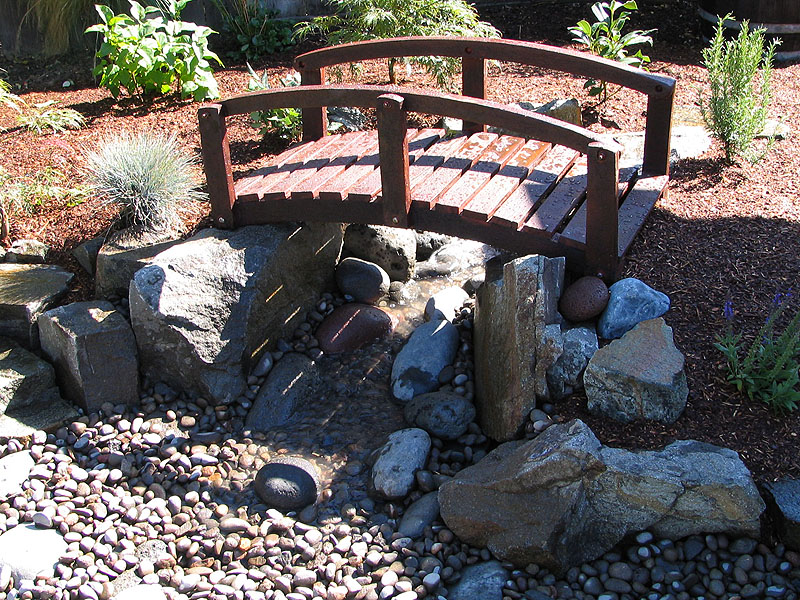
Water feature

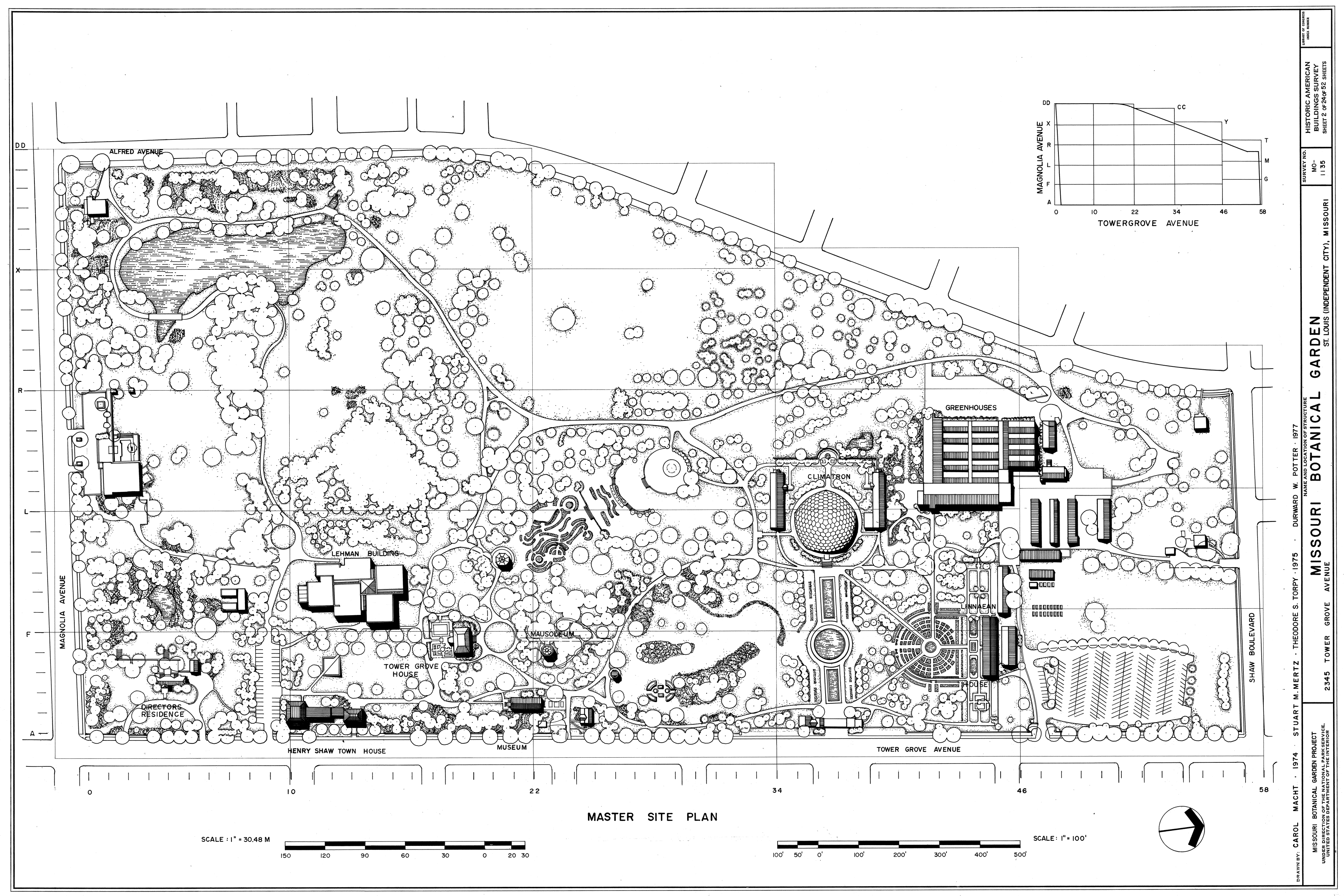
Missouri Botanical Garden

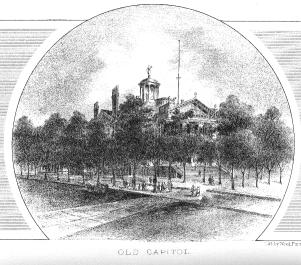

Landscape detailing describes the process of integrating soft and hard landscape materials to create a landscape design. It requires knowledge of landscape architecture, landscape engineering, and landscape products.

Landscape detailing can be boiled down to three different steps: function, structure, and appearance. Function allows to satisfy the requirements of the landscape to serve a purpose. Structure is the physical implementation of function through the best available resources, usually those of a local character. Appearance is about obtaining visual satisfaction, commonly known as aesthetic values.

== Social and environmental considerations ==
Landscape detailing can influence the attitude and mood of a landscape. A study was conducted on how young people feel when in a natural oriented landscape versus an engineered habitat. The results showed that more structured landscapes are preferred in young people. Detailing in landscape allows the designer to make choices that help influence the landscape, allowing the potential to be shown.

Landscape can have an influence on how communities and societies evolve and vice versa. Communities can shape how the landscape is used based on the needs of the community. An example of this is Canada's landscape and the role the rail roads had in shaping the community. With the introduction of the rail road, Canada's wild lands were more susceptible to exploitation and allowed the community to experience Canada's array of national parks.

Landscape detailing is not just limited to actual land, but can also be seen as a way to improve the waterfront area, making the waterfront a more appealing setting for the public to enjoy. Typically, when addressing the relationship of landscape detailing and water, drainage is considered and how the landscape can be manipulated to prevent flooding and maintain water flows.

== Technology ==
With today's every expanding technologies, there has been an increase in ways to convey landscape detailing. The visualization tools can be split into two categories: traditional and computerized. Traditional ways to convey details in the landscape would be simply a pen/pencil, paper maps, and models. While the computerized way would use GIS, 3D virtual modeling, or simulations using layers of photography to convey urban areas that have potential to be molded.

== See also ==
- Garden design
- Landscape design

== Notes ==
- 1. Lückmann, K., Lagemann, V., & Menzel, S. (2013). Landscape Assessment and Evaluation of Young People: Comparing Nature-Orientated Habitat and Engineered Habitat Preferences. Environment & Behavior, 45(1), 86-112.
- 2. Williams, R. (2012). HOW TRAINS SHAPED CANADA'S LANDSCAPE. Landscapes/Paysages, 14(2), 46-47.
- 3. Schmid, A. S. (1983). Design in the river landscape. Science Direct, 10(1), 31-41.
- 4.Al-Kodmany, K. (2001). Visualization tools and methods for participatory planning and design. Journal of Urban Technology, 8(2), 1-37.
- 5. Thompson, I. H. (2002). Landscape and urban planning. 60(2), 81-93.
