= Landscape architecture =

Design of outdoor public areas, landmarks, and structures

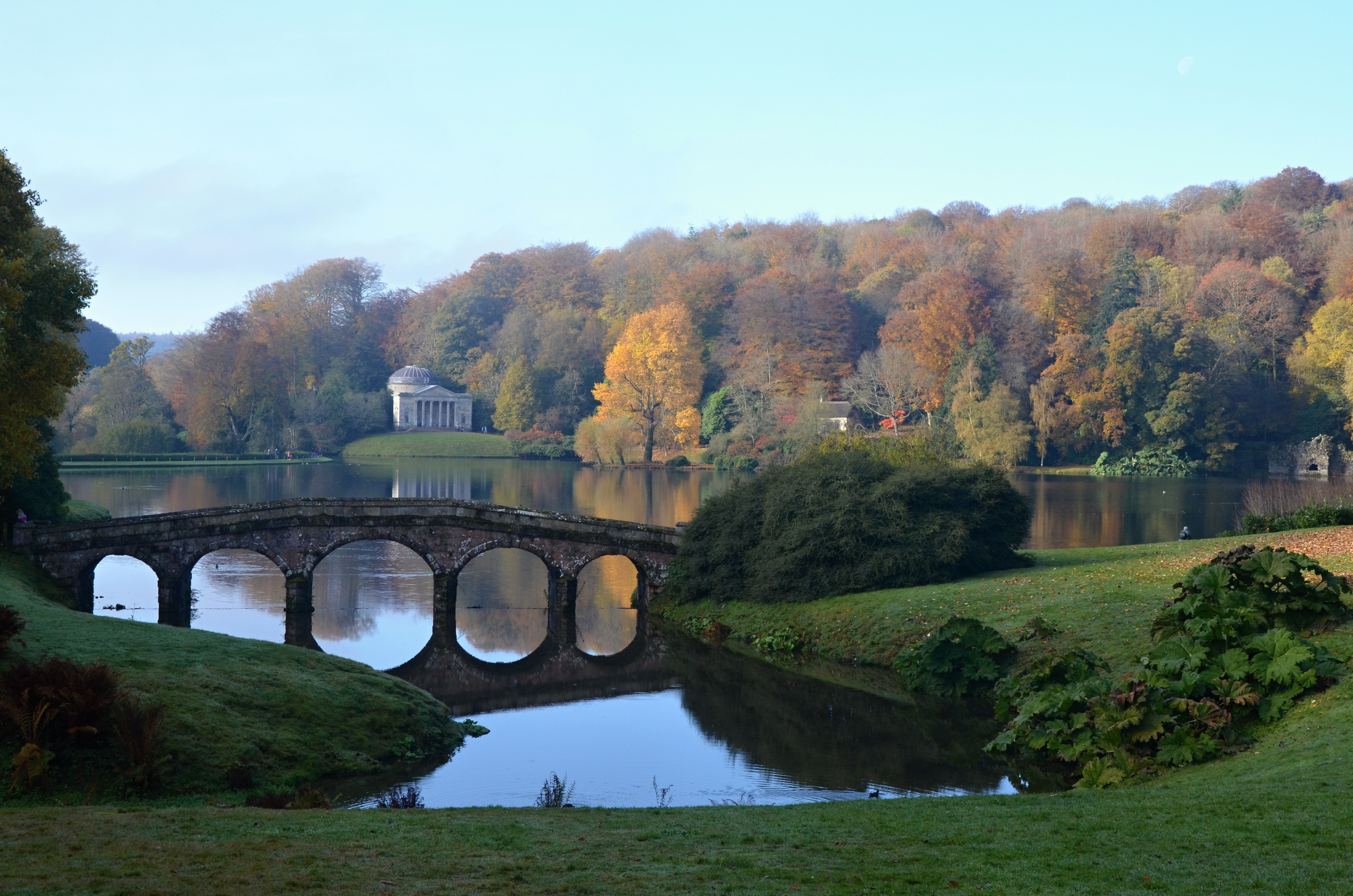
Stourhead in Wiltshire, England, designed by Henry Hoare, "the first landscape gardener, who showed in a single work, genius of the highest order"

Landscape architecture is the design of outdoor areas, landmarks, and structures to achieve environmental, social-behavioural, or aesthetic outcomes. It involves the systematic design and general engineering of various structures for construction and human use, investigation of existing social, ecological, and soil conditions and processes in the landscape, and the design of other interventions that will produce desired outcomes.

The scope of the profession is broad and can be subdivided into several sub-categories including professional or licensed landscape architects who are regulated by governmental agencies and possess the expertise to design a wide range of structures and landforms for human use; landscape design which is not a licensed profession; site planning; stormwater management; erosion control; environmental restoration; public realm, parks, recreation and urban planning; visual resource management; green infrastructure planning and provision; and private estate and residence landscape master planning and design; all at varying scales of design, planning and management. A practitioner in the profession of landscape architecture may be called a landscape architect; however, in jurisdictions where professional licenses are required it is often only those who possess a landscape architect license who can be called a landscape architect.

== Definition of landscape architecture ==
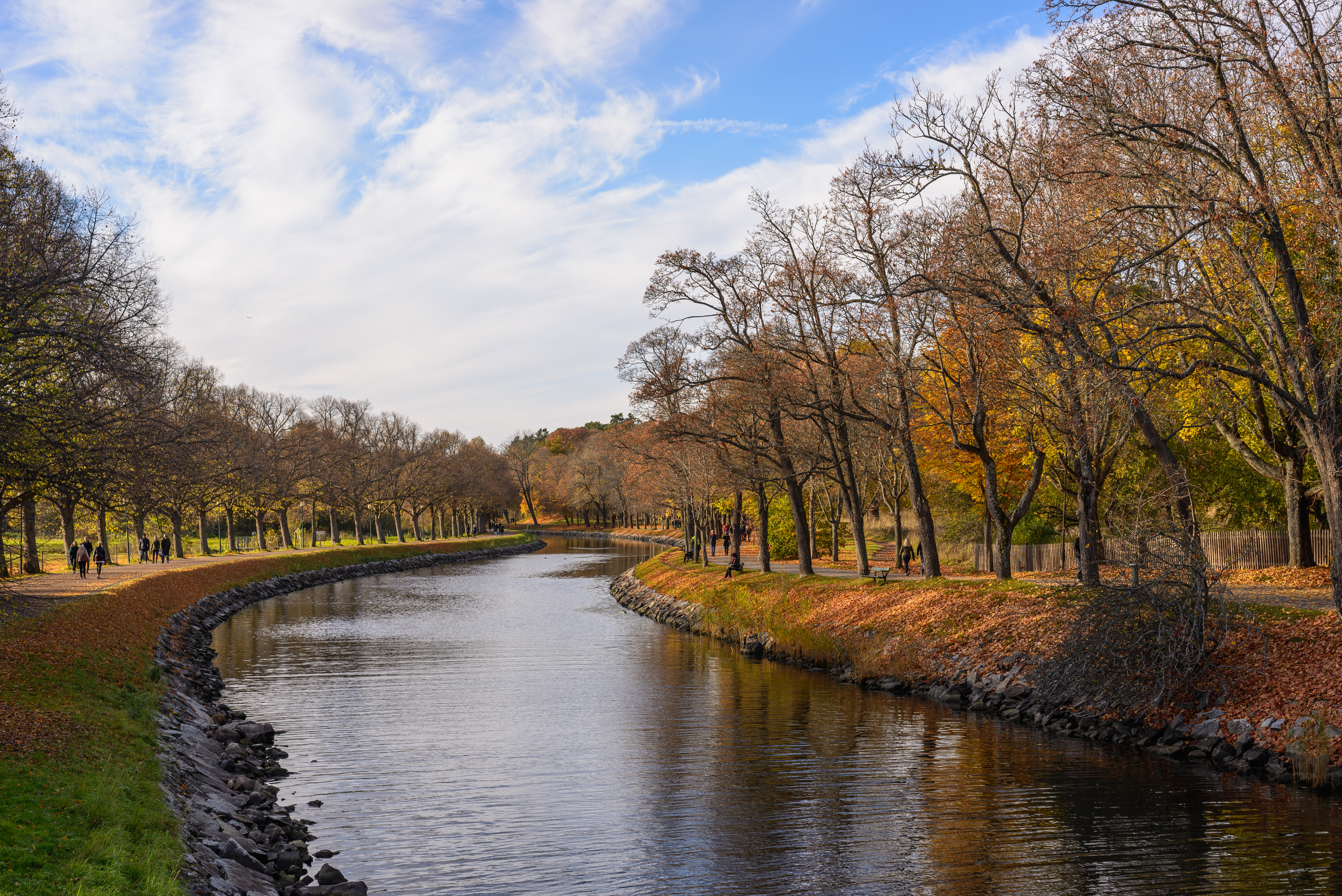
A canal design focused on esthetical landscape architecture in Stockholm, Sweden.

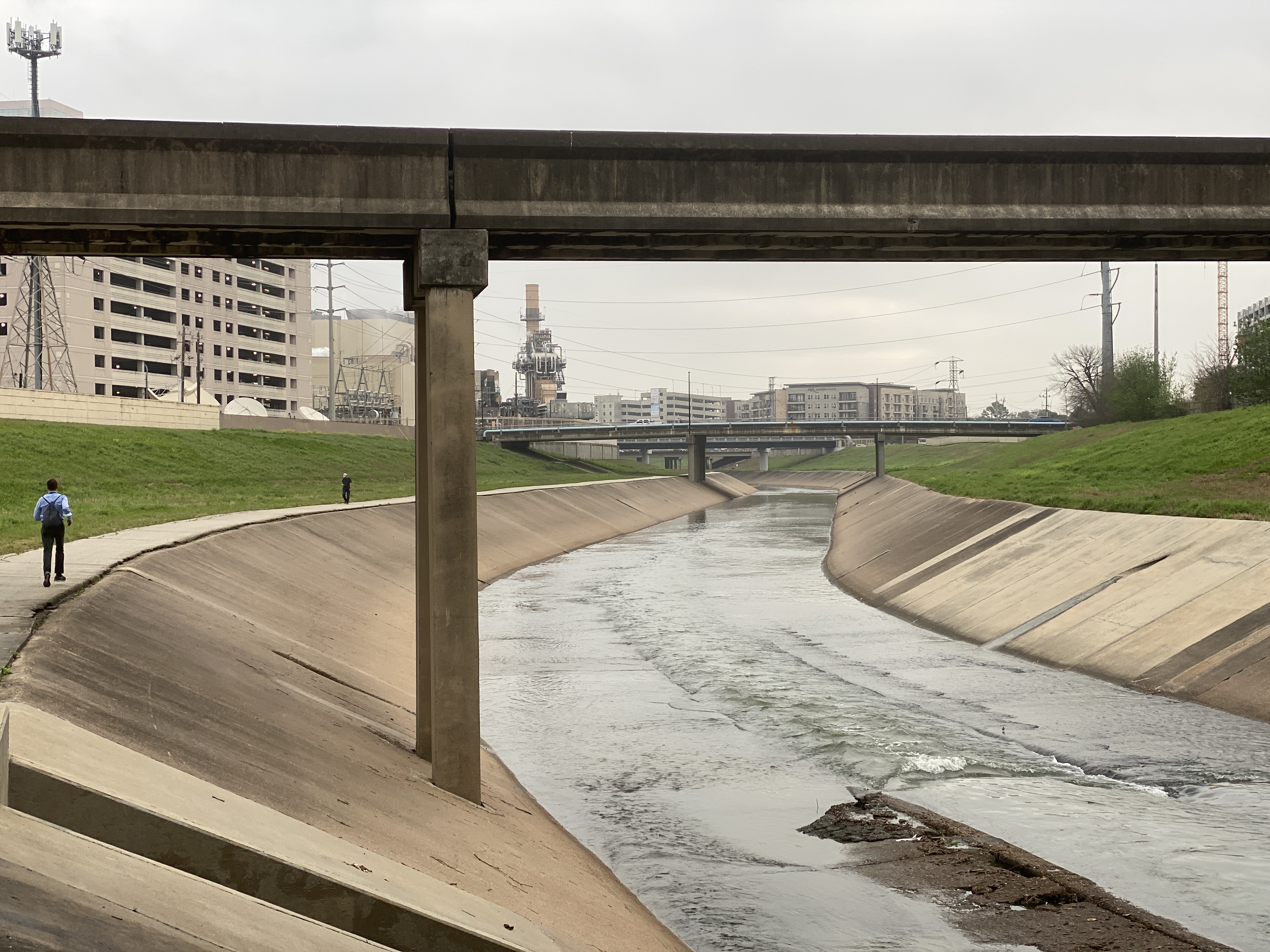
A river with concrete walls like those of a flood control channel, a historic flood-control measure using landscape engineering in Houston, Texas. Such channelling, intended to be strictly functional, may make flooding worse by speeding the flow instead of spreading the pulse of floodwater.

Modern landscape architecture is a multi-disciplinary field, incorporating aspects of urban design, architecture, geography, ecology, civil engineering, structural engineering, horticulture, environmental psychology, industrial design, soil sciences, botany, and fine arts. The activities of a landscape architect can range from the creation of public parks and parkways to site planning for campuses and corporate office parks; from the design of residential estates to the design of civil infrastructure; and from the management of large wilderness areas to reclamation of degraded landscapes such as mines or landfills. Landscape architects work on structures and external spaces in the landscape aspect of the design – large or small, urban, suburban and rural, and with "hard" (built) and "soft" (planted) materials, while integrating ecological sustainability.

The most valuable contribution can be made at the first stage of a project to generate ideas with technical understanding and creative flair for the design, organization, and use of spaces. The landscape architect can conceive the overall concept and prepare the master plan, from which detailed design drawings and technical specifications are prepared. They can also review proposals to authorize and supervise contracts for the construction work. Other skills include preparing design impact assessments, conducting environmental assessments and audits, and serving as an expert witness at inquiries on land use issues. The majority of their time will most likely be spent inside an office building designing and preparing models for clients.

== History ==
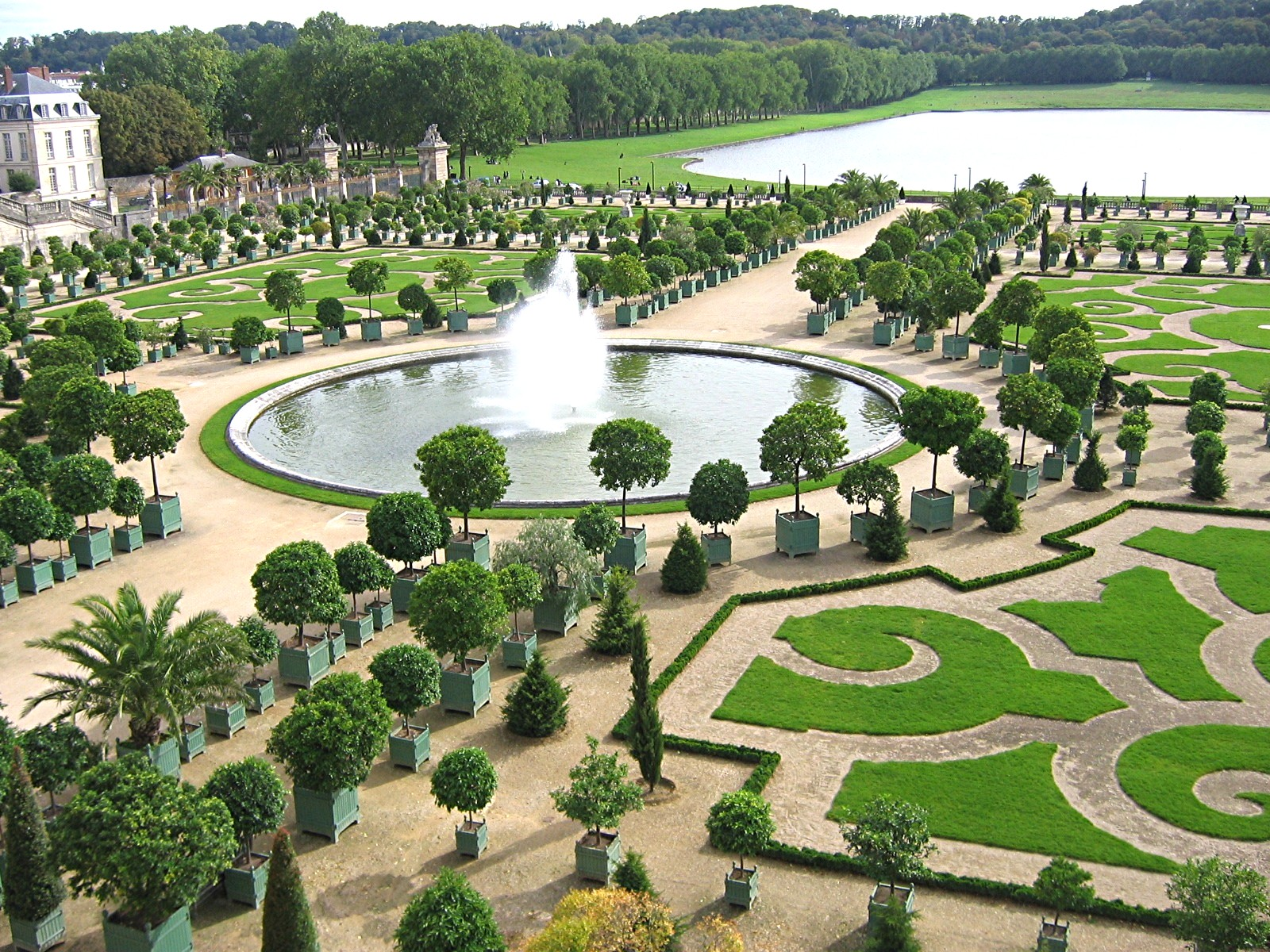
Orangery at the Palace of Versailles, outside Paris

For the period before 1800, the history of landscape gardening (later called landscape architecture) is largely that of master planning and garden design for manor houses, palaces and royal properties. An example is the extensive work by André Le Nôtre for King Louis XIV of France on the Gardens of Versailles. The first person to write of making a landscape was Joseph Addison in 1712. The term landscape architecture was invented by Gilbert Laing Meason in 1828, and John Claudius Loudon (1783–1843) was instrumental in the adoption of the term landscape architecture by the modern profession. He took up the term from Meason and gave it publicity in his Encyclopedias and in his 1840 book on the Landscape Gardening and Landscape Architecture of the Late Humphry Repton.

John Claudius Loudon was an established and influential horticultural journalist and Scottish landscape architect whose writings were instrumental in shaping Victorian taste in gardens, public parks, and architecture. In the Landscape Gardening and Landscape Architecture of the Late Humphry Repton, Loudon describes two distinct styles of landscape gardening existing at the beginning of the 19th century: geometric and natural. Loudon wrote that each style reflected a different stage of society. The geometric style was “most striking and pleasing,” displaying wealth and taste in an “early state of society” and in “countries where the general scenery was wild, irregular, and natural, and man, comparatively, uncultivated and unrefined.” The natural style was used in “modern times” and in countries where “society is in a higher state of cultivation," displaying wealth and taste through the sacrifice of profitable lands to make room for such designs.

The prominent English landscape designer Humphry Repton (1752-1818) echoed similar ideas in his work and design ideas. In his writings on the use of delineated spaces (e.g. courtyards, terrace walls, fences), Repton states that while the motive for defense no longer exists, the features are still useful in separating "the gardens, which belong to man, and the forest, or desert, which belongs to the wild denizens." Repton refers to Indigenous peoples as "uncivilized human beings, against whom some decided line of defense was absolutely necessary."

The practice of landscape architecture spread from the Old to the New World. Though the term "landscape architect" was first used by Gilbert Meason in 1828, it was not used as a professional title by Frederick Law Olmsted in the United States until the mid-19th century. Andrew Jackson Downing, another early American landscape designer, was editor of The Horticulturist magazine (1846–52). In 1841 his first book, A Treatise on the Theory and Practice of Landscape Gardening, Adapted to North America, was published to a great success; it was the first book of its kind published in the United States. During the latter 19th century, the term landscape architect began to be used by professional landscapes designers, and was firmly established after Frederick Law Olmsted Jr. and Beatrix Jones (later Farrand) with others founded the American Society of Landscape Architects (ASLA) in 1899. IFLA was founded at Cambridge, England, in 1948 with Sir Geoffrey Jellicoe as its first president, representing 15 countries from Europe and North America. Later, in 1978, IFLA's Headquarters were established in Versailles.

== Fields of activity ==
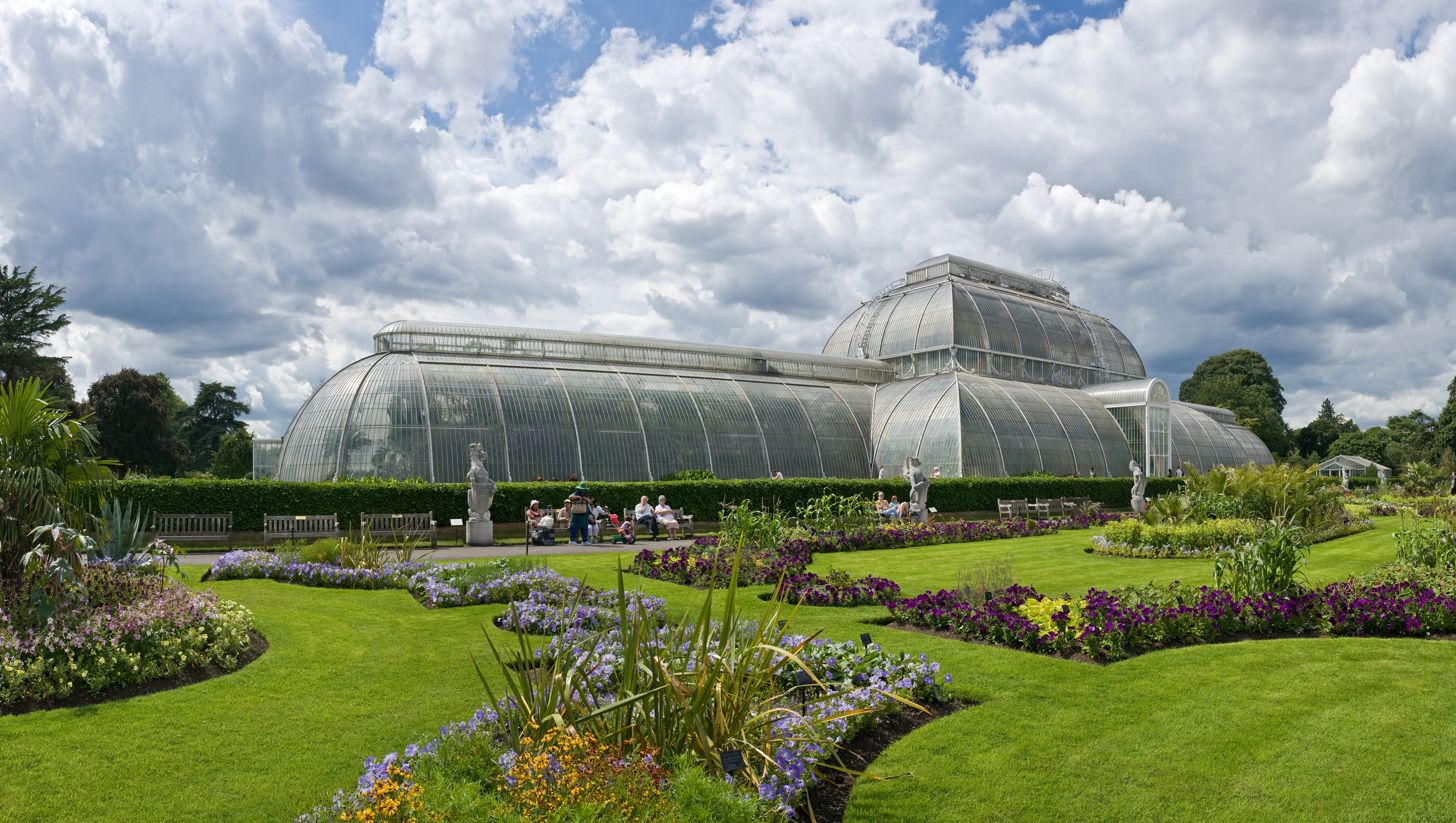
Royal Botanic Gardens, Kew, London, established 1759 The Palm House, Kew, built 1844–1848 by Richard Turner to Decimus Burton's designs

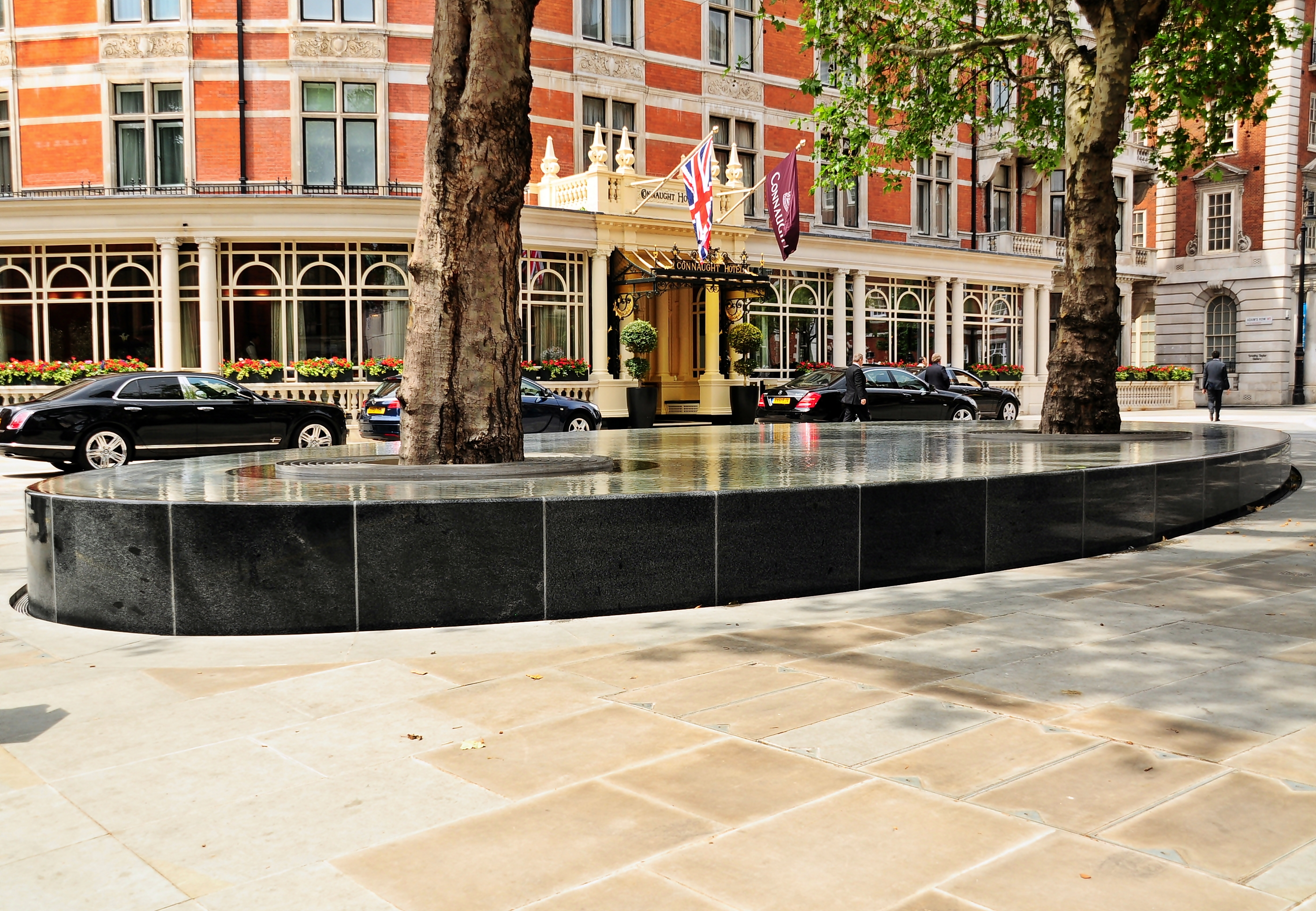
Urban design in city squares. Water feature in London, by Tadao Ando who also works with landscapes and gardens

The variety of the professional tasks that landscape architects collaborate on is very wide, but some examples of project types include:

- Parks of general design and public infrastructure
- Sustainable development
- Stormwater management including rain gardens, green roofs, groundwater recharge, green infrastructure, and constructed wetlands.
- Landscape design for educational function and site design for public institutions and government facilities
- Parks, botanical gardens, arboretums, greenways, and nature preserves
- Recreation facilities, such as playgrounds, golf courses, theme parks and sports facilities
- Housing areas, industrial parks and commercial developments
- Estate and residence landscape planning and design
- Landscaping and accents on highways, transportation structures, bridges, and transit corridors
- Contributions to urban design, town and city squares, waterfronts, pedestrian schemes
- Natural park, tourist destination, and recreating historical landscapes, and historic garden appraisal and conservation studies
- Reservoirs, dams, power stations, reclamation of extractive industry applications or major industrial projects and mitigation
- Environmental assessment and landscape assessment, planning advice and land management proposals.
- Coastal and offshore developments and mitigation
- Ecological design (any aspect of design that minimizes environmentally destructive impacts by integrating itself with natural processes and sustainability)

Landscape managers use their knowledge of landscape processes to advise on the long-term care and development of the landscape. They often work in forestry, nature conservation and agriculture.

Landscape scientists have specialist skills such as soil science, hydrology, geomorphology or botany that they relate to the practical problems of landscape work. Their projects can range from site surveys to the ecological assessment of broad areas for planning or management purposes. They may also report on the impact of development or the importance of particular species in a given area.

Landscape planners are concerned with landscape planning for the location, scenic, ecological and recreational aspects of urban, rural, and coastal land use. Their work is embodied in written statements of policy and strategy, and their remit includes master planning for new developments, landscape evaluations and assessments, and preparing countryside management or policy plans. Some may also apply an additional specialism such as landscape archaeology or law to the process of landscape planning.

Green roof (or more specifically, vegetative roof) designers design extensive and intensive roof gardens for stormwater management, evapotranspirative cooling, sustainable architecture, aesthetics, and habitat creation.

== Relation to urban planning ==
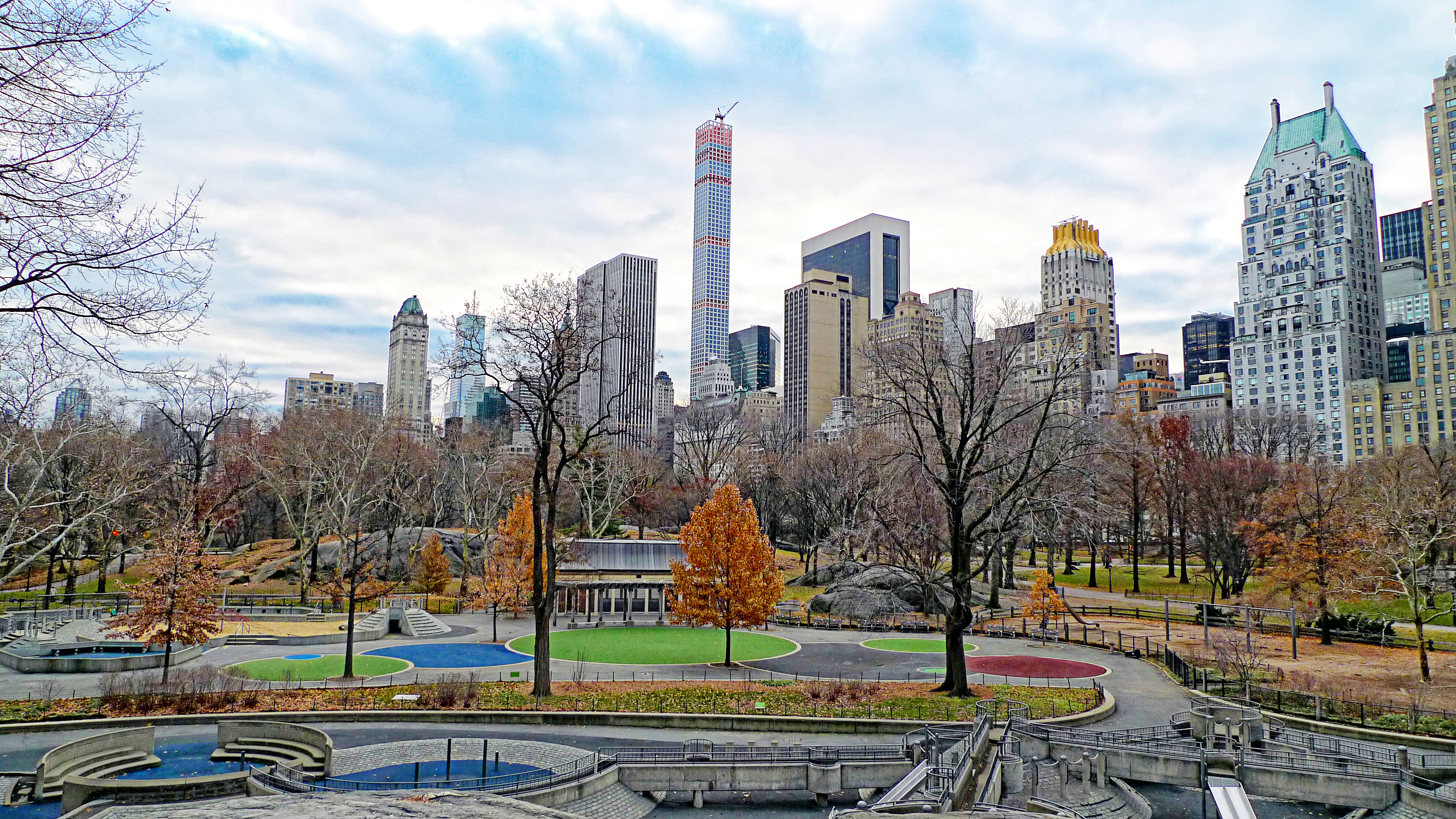
The combination of traditional landscape gardening and emerging city planning gave landscape architecture its unique focus. Frederick Law Olmsted used the term 'landscape architecture' using the word as a profession for the first time when designing the Central Park.

Through the 19th century, urban planning became a focal point and central issue in cities. The combination of the tradition of landscape gardening and the emerging field of urban planning offered landscape architecture an opportunity to serve these needs. In the second half of the century, Frederick Law Olmsted completed a series of parks that continue to have a significant influence on the practices of landscape architecture today. Among these were Central Park in New York City, Prospect Park in Brooklyn, New York and Boston's Emerald Necklace park system. Jens Jensen designed sophisticated and naturalistic urban and regional parks for Chicago, Illinois, and private estates for the Ford family including Fair Lane and Gaukler Point. One of the original eleven founding members of the American Society of Landscape Architects (ASLA), and the only woman, was Beatrix Farrand. She was a design consultant for over a dozen universities including: Princeton in Princeton, New Jersey; Yale in New Haven, Connecticut; and the Arnold Arboretum for Harvard in Boston, Massachusetts. Her numerous private estate projects include the landmark Dumbarton Oaks in the Georgetown neighborhood of Washington, D.C. Since that time, other architects – most notably Ruth Havey and Alden Hopkins – changed certain elements of the Farrand design.

Since this period urban planning has developed into a separate independent profession that has incorporated important contributions from other fields such as civil engineering, architecture and public administration. Urban Planners are qualified to perform tasks independent of landscape architects, and in general, the curriculum of landscape architecture programs does not prepare students to become urban planners.

Landscape architecture continues to develop as a design discipline and to respond to the various movements in architecture and design throughout the 20th and 21st centuries. Thomas Church was a pioneering mid-century landscape architect known for shaping modern American garden design. Roberto Burle Marx in Brazil combined the International style and native Brazilian plants and culture for a new aesthetic. Innovation continues today solving challenging problems with contemporary design solutions for master planning, landscapes, and gardens.

Ian McHarg was known for introducing environmental concerns in landscape architecture. He popularized a system of analyzing the layers of a site in order to compile a complete understanding of the qualitative attributes of a place. This system became the foundation of today's Geographic Information Systems (GIS). McHarg would give every qualitative aspect of the site a layer, such as the history, hydrology, topography, vegetation, etc. GIS software is ubiquitously used in the landscape architecture profession today to analyze materials in and on the Earth's surface and is similarly used by urban planners, geographers, forestry and natural resources professionals, etc.

European nations enabled the widespread circulation of urban planning strategies by transferring landscaping ideas and practices to overseas colonies. The green belt was a popular landscape practice exported by Britain onto colonial territories such as Haifa (1918-1948). Spatial mechanisms like the green belt, implemented through the Haifa Bay Plan and the British "Grand Model," were used to enforce political control and civic order and extend western ideas of progress and development. The Greater London Regional Planning Committee accepted the green belt concept which formed the basis of the 1938 Green Belt Act. The planning prototype demarcated open spaces, distinguished between city and countryside, limited urban growth, and created zoning divisions. It was used extensively in the British colonies to facilitate British rule through the organized division of landscape and populations.

== Relation to Indigenous practices ==
Indigenous land management practices create constantly changing landscapes through the use of vegetation and natural systems, contrasting with Western epistemologies of the discipline that separate ornament from function. The discipline of landscape architecture favors western designs made from structured materials and geometric forms. Landscape architecture history books tend to include projects that contain constructed architectural elements that persist over time, excluding many Indigenous landscape-based designs.

Landscape architecture textbooks often place Indigenous peoples as a prefix to the official start of the discipline. The widely read landscape history text The Landscape of Man (1964) offers a global history of the designed landscape from past to present, featuring African and other Indigenous peoples in its discussions of Paleolithic man between 500,000 and 8,000 BCE in relation to human migration. Indigenous land-management practices are described as archaeological rather than a part of contemporary practice. Gardens in Time (1980) also places Indigenous practice in prehistory at the beginning of the landscape architecture timeline. Authors John and Ray Oldham describe Aborigines of Australia as "survivors of an ancient way of life" who provide an opportunity to examine Western Australia as a "meeting place of a prehistoric man".

In the late 18th century, the landscapes created by aboriginal land and fire management practices appealed to English settlers in Australia. Journals from the period of early white settlement note the landscape resembling parks and popular designs in English landscape gardens of the same period. In England, these designs were considered sophisticated and celebrated for the intentional sacrifice of usable land. In Australia, the park-like condition was used to justify British control, citing its emptiness and lack of productive use as a basis for the dispossession of Aboriginal people.

== Education ==
Landscape architects are generally required to have university or graduate education from an accredited landscape architecture degree program, which can vary in length and degree title. They learn how to create projects from scratch, such as residential or commercial planting and designing outdoor living spaces. They are willing to work with others to get a better outcome for the customers when doing a project, and learn the basics of how to create a project on a manner of time, how to interact with clients and how to explain a design from scratch when presenting a final project.

== Profession ==
In many countries, a professional institute, comprising members of the professional community, exists in order to protect the standing of the profession and promote its interests, and sometimes also regulate the practice of landscape architecture. The standard and strength of legal regulations governing landscape architecture practice varies from nation to nation, with some requiring licensure in order to practice and some having little or no regulation. In Europe, North America, parts of South America, Australia, India, and New Zealand, landscape architecture is a regulated profession.

=== Argentina ===
Since 1889, with the arrival of the French architect and urbanist landscaper Carlos Thays, recommended to recreate the National Capital's parks and public gardens, it was consolidated an apprentice and training program in landscaping that eventually became a regulated profession, currently the leading academic institution is the UBA University of Buenos Aires"UBA Facultad de Arquitectura, Diseño y Urbanismo" (Faculty of Architecture, Design and Urbanism) offering a Bacherlor's degree in Urban Landscaping Design and Planning, the profession itself is regulated by the National Ministry of Urban Planning of Argentina and the Institute of the Buenos Aires Botanical Garden.

=== Australia ===
The Australian Institute of Landscape Architects (AILA) provides accreditation of university degrees and non-statutory professional registration for landscape architects. Once recognized by AILA, landscape architects use the title 'Registered Landscape Architect' across the six states and territories within Australia.

AILA's system of professional recognition is a national system overseen by the AILA National Office in Canberra. To apply for AILA Registration, an applicant usually needs to satisfy a number of pre-requisites, including a university qualification, a minimum number of years of practice and a record of professional experience.

Landscape Architecture within Australia covers a broad spectrum of planning, design, management, and research. From specialist design services for government and private sector developments through to specialist professional advice as an expert witness.

=== Canada ===
In Canada, landscape architecture, like law and medicine, is a self-regulating profession pursuant to provincial statute. For example, Ontario's profession is governed by the Ontario Association of Landscape Architects pursuant to the Ontario Association of Landscape Architects Act. Landscape architects in Ontario, British Columbia, and Alberta must complete the specified components of L.A.R.E (Landscape Architecture Registration Examination) as a prerequisite to full professional standing.

Provincial regulatory bodies are members of a national organization, the Canadian Society of Landscape Architects / L'Association des Architectes Paysagistes du Canada (CSLA-AAPC), and individual membership in the CSLA-AAPC is obtained through joining one of the provincial or territorial components.

=== Indonesia ===
ISLA (Indonesia Society of Landscape Architects) is the Indonesian society for professional landscape architects formed on 4 February 1978 and is a member of IFLA APR and IFLA World. The main aim is to increase the dignity of the professional members of landscape architects by increasing their active role in community service and national and international development. The management of IALI consists of National Administrators who are supported by 20 Regional Administrators (Provincial level) and 3 Branch Managers at city level throughout Indonesia.

Landscape architecture education in Indonesia was held in 18 universities, which graduated D3, Bachelor and Magister graduates. Landscape architecture education is incorporated in the Association of Indonesian Landscape Architecture Education.

=== Italy ===
AIAPP (Associazione Italiana Architettura del Paesaggio) is the Italian association of professional landscape architects formed in 1950 and a member of IFLA and IFLA Europe (formerly known as EFLA). AIAPP is contesting this new law which has given the Architects' Association the new title of Architects, Landscape Architects, Planners and Conservationists whether or not they have any training or experience in any of these fields other than Architecture. In Italy, there are several different professions involved in landscape architecture:

- Architects
- Landscape designers
- Doctor landscape agronomists and Doctor landscape foresters, often called Landscape agronomists.
- Agrarian Experts and Graduated Agrarian experts.

=== New Zealand ===
The New Zealand Institute of Landscape Architects (NZILA) is the professional body for Landscape Architects in NZ.

In April 2013, NZILA jointly with AILA, hosted the 50th International Federation of Landscape Architects (IFLA) World Congress in Auckland, New Zealand. The World Congress is an international conference where Landscape Architects from all around the globe meet to share ideas around a particular topic.

Within NZ, Members of NZILA when they achieve their professional standing, can use the title Registered Landscape Architect NZILA.

NZILA provides an education policy and an accreditation process to review education programme providers; currently there are three accredited undergraduate Landscape Architecture programmes in New Zealand. Lincoln University also has an accredited masters programme in landscape architecture.

=== Norway ===
Landscape architecture in Norway was established in 1919 at the Norwegian University of Life Sciences (NMBU) at Ås. The Norwegian School of Landscape Architecture at the Faculty of Landscape and Society is responsible for Europe's oldest landscape architecture education on an academic level. The department's areas include design and design of cities and places, garden art history, landscape engineering, greenery, zone planning, site development, place making and place keeping.

=== South Africa ===
In May 1962, Joane Pim, Ann Sutton, Peter Leutscher and Roelf Botha (considered the forefathers of the profession in South Africa) established the Institute for Landscape Architects, now known as the Institute for Landscape Architecture in South Africa (ILASA). ILASA is a voluntary organisation registered with the South African Council for the Landscape Architectural Profession (SACLAP). It consists of three regional bodies, namely, Gauteng, KwaZula-Natal and the Western Cape. ILASA's mission is to advance the profession of landscape architecture and uphold high standards of professional service to its members, and to represent the profession of landscape architecture in any matter which may affect the interests of the members of the institute. ILASA holds the country's membership with The International Federation of Landscape Architects (IFLA).

In South Africa, the profession is regulated by SACLAP, established as a statutory council in terms of Section 2 of the South African Council for the Landscape Architectural Profession Act – Act 45 of 2000. The Council evolved out of the Board of Control for Landscape Architects (BOCLASA), which functioned under the Council of Architects in terms of The Architectural Act, Act 73 of 1970. SACLAP's mission is to establish, direct, sustain and ensure a high level of professional responsibilities and ethical conduct within the art and science of landscape architecture with honesty, dignity and integrity in the broad interest of public health, safety and welfare of the community.

After completion of an accredited under-graduate and/or post-graduate qualification in landscape architecture at either the University of Cape Town or the University of Pretoria, or landscape technology at the Cape Peninsula University of Technology, professional registration is attained via a mandatory mentored candidacy period (minimum of two years) and sitting of the professional registration exam. After successfully completing the exam, the individual is entitled to the status of Professional Landscape Architect or Professional Landscape Technologist.

=== Sweden ===
Architects Sweden, Sveriges Arkitekter, is the collective trade union and professional organisation for all architects, including landscape architects, in Sweden. The professional body is a member of IFLA (International Federation of Landscape Architects) and IFLA Europe.

As a landscape architect, anyone can become a member of Architects Sweden if they have a national or international university degree that is approved by the association. If the degree is from within the European Union, Architects Sweden approves Landscape architect educations listed by IFLA Europe. For educations outside the EU, the association makes an assessment on a statement from the Swedish Council for Higher Education (UHR).

=== United Kingdom ===
The UK's professional body is the Landscape Institute (LI). It is a chartered body that accredits landscape professionals and university courses. At present there are fifteen accredited programmes in the UK. Membership of the LI is available to students, academics and professionals, and there are over 3,000 professionally qualified members.

The Institute provides services to assist members including support and promotion of the work of landscape architects; information and guidance to the public and industry about the specific expertise offered by those in the profession; and training and educational advice to students and professionals looking to build upon their experience.

In 2008, the LI launched a major recruitment drive entitled "I want to be a Landscape Architect" to encourage the study of Landscape Architecture. The campaign aimed to raise the profile of landscape architecture and highlight its valuable role in building sustainable communities and fighting climate change.

As of July 2018, the "I want to be a Landscape Architect" initiative was replaced by a brand new careers campaign entitled #ChooseLandscape, which aims to raise awareness of landscape as a profession; improve and increase access to landscape education; and inspire young people to choose landscape as a career. This new campaign includes other landscape-related professions such as landscape management, landscape planning, landscape science and urban design.

=== United States ===
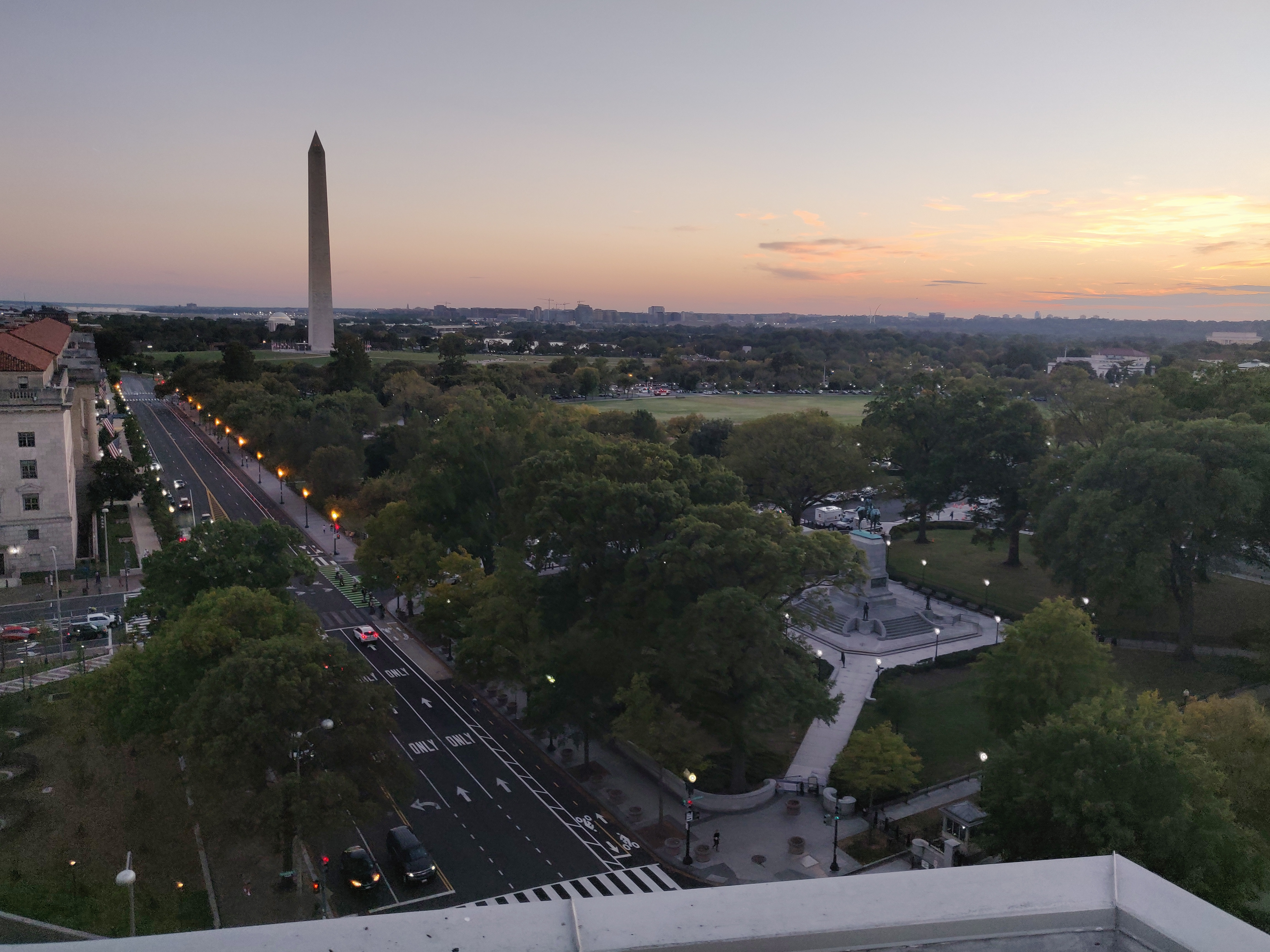
The National Mall in Washington, D.C. includes many examples of landscape architecture based on historical memorials and monuments.

In the United States, landscape architecture is regulated by individual state governments. For a landscape architect, obtaining licensure requires advanced education and work experience, plus passage of the national examination called the Landscape Architect Registration Examination (L.A.R.E.). Licensing is overseen at the national level by the Council of Landscape Architectural Registration Boards (CLARB). Several states require passage of a state exam as well.

Landscape architecture has been identified as an above-average growth profession by the US Bureau of Labor Statistics and was listed in U.S. News & World Report's list of Best Jobs to Have in 2006, 2007, 2008, 2009 and 2010. The national trade association for United States landscape architects is the American Society of Landscape Architects. Frederick Law Olmsted, who designed Central Park in New York City, is known as the "father of American landscape architecture".

== Examples ==
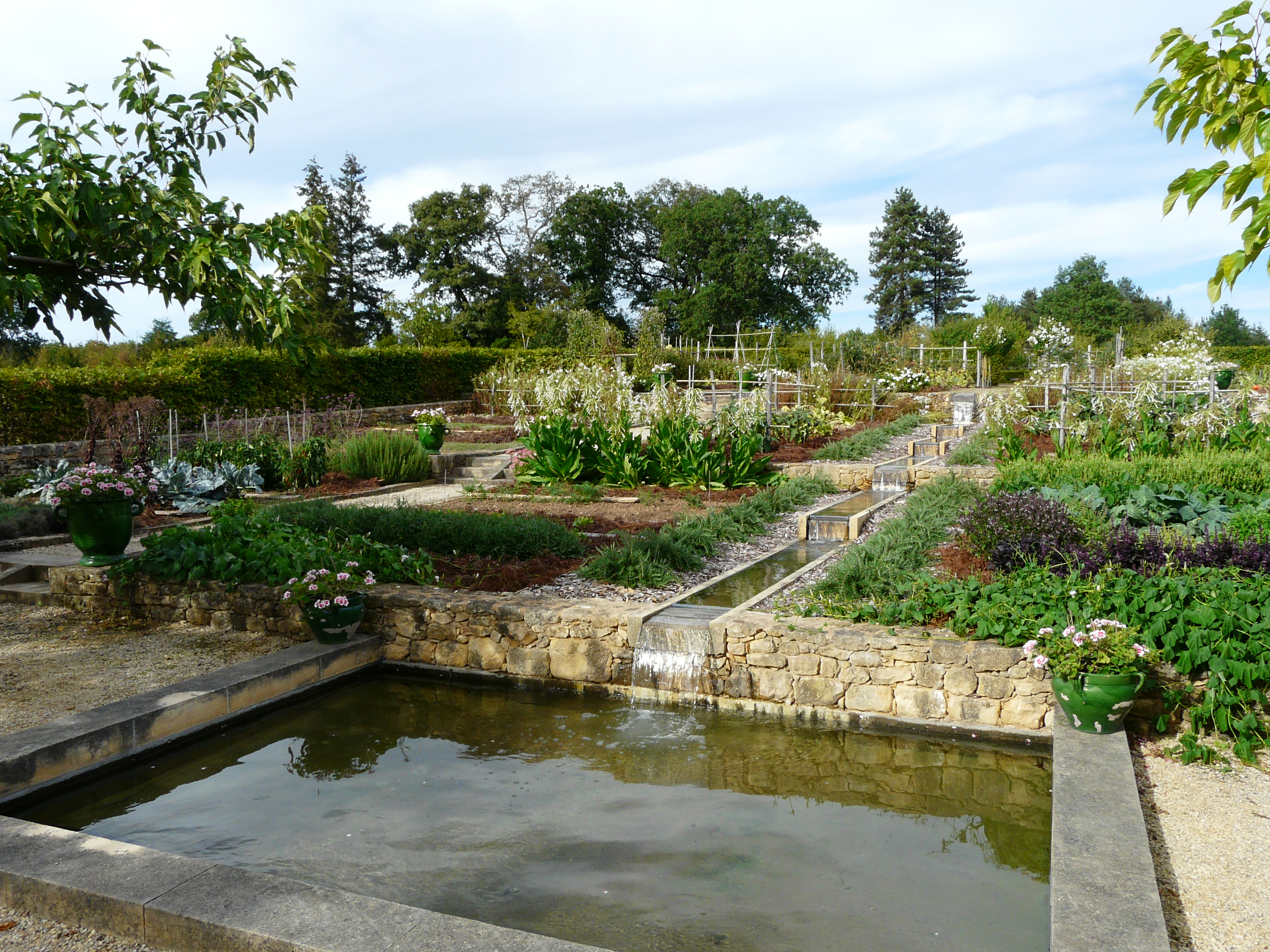
Potager in Dordogne, France

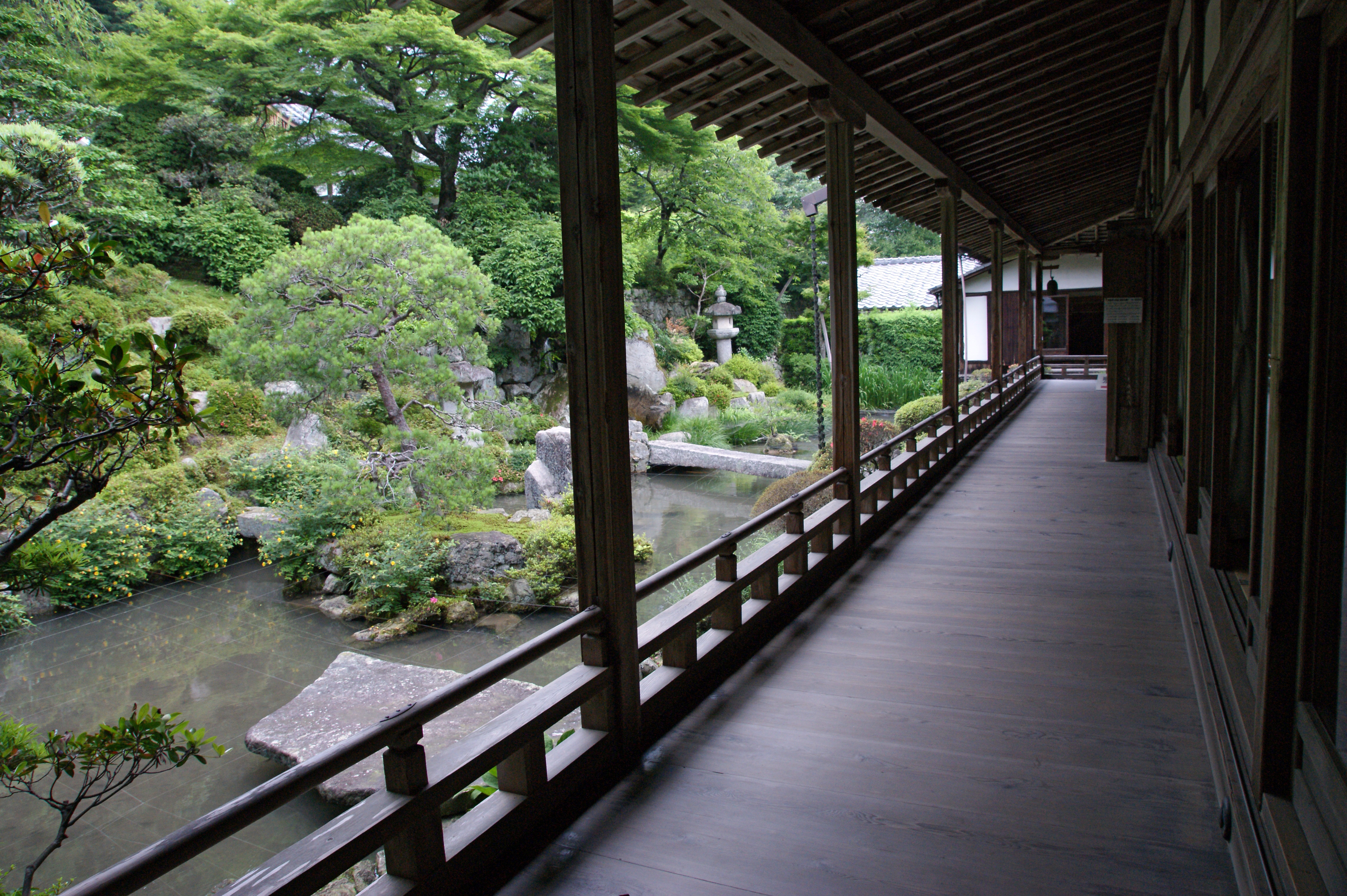
Japanese garden in Ōtsu, Japan

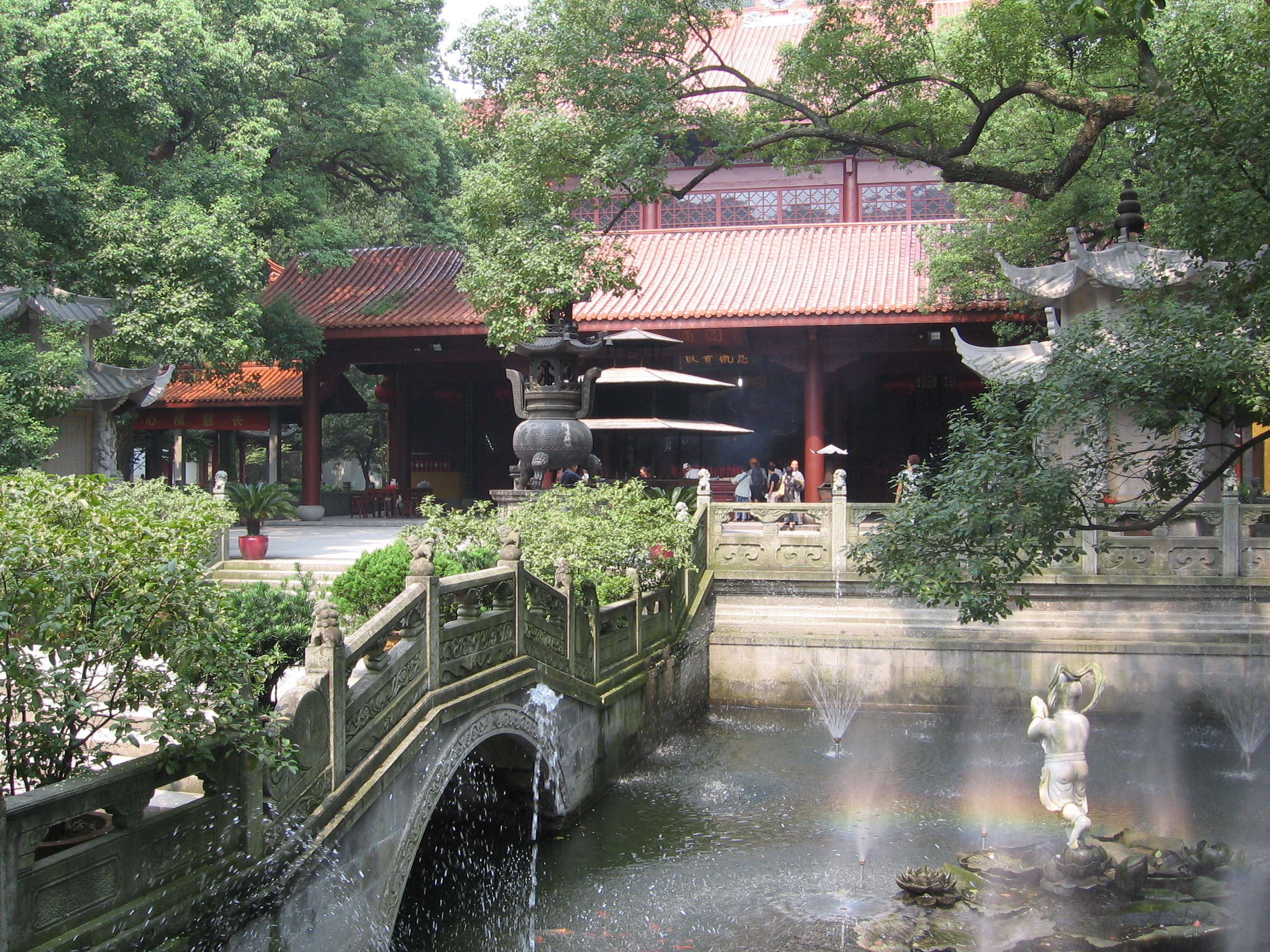
Classical Chinese garden

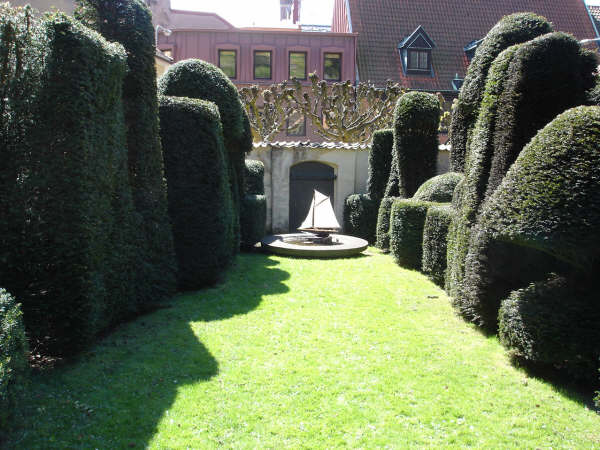
Topiary in Helsingborg, Sweden

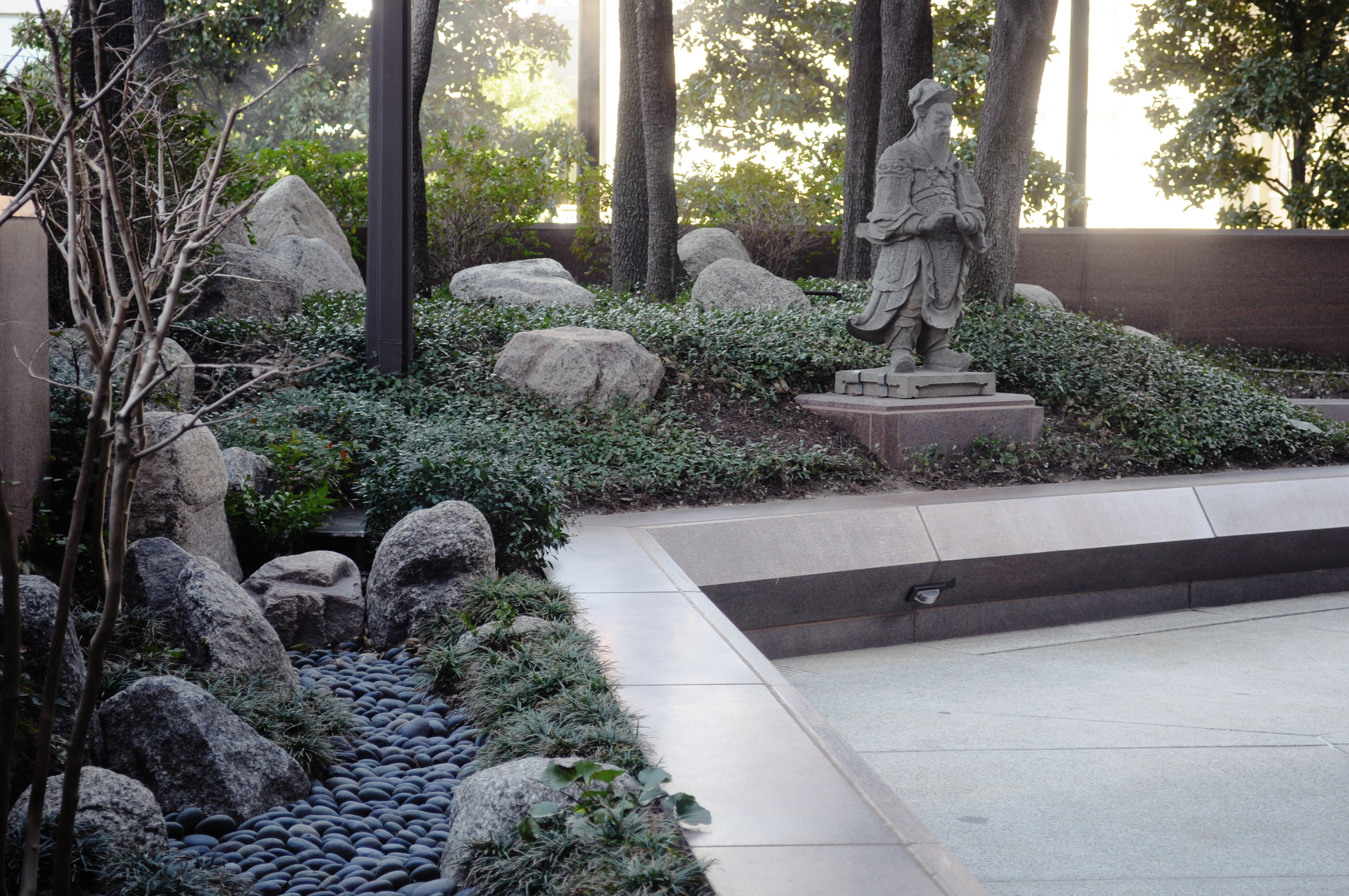
Asian sculpture garden in Texas, United States

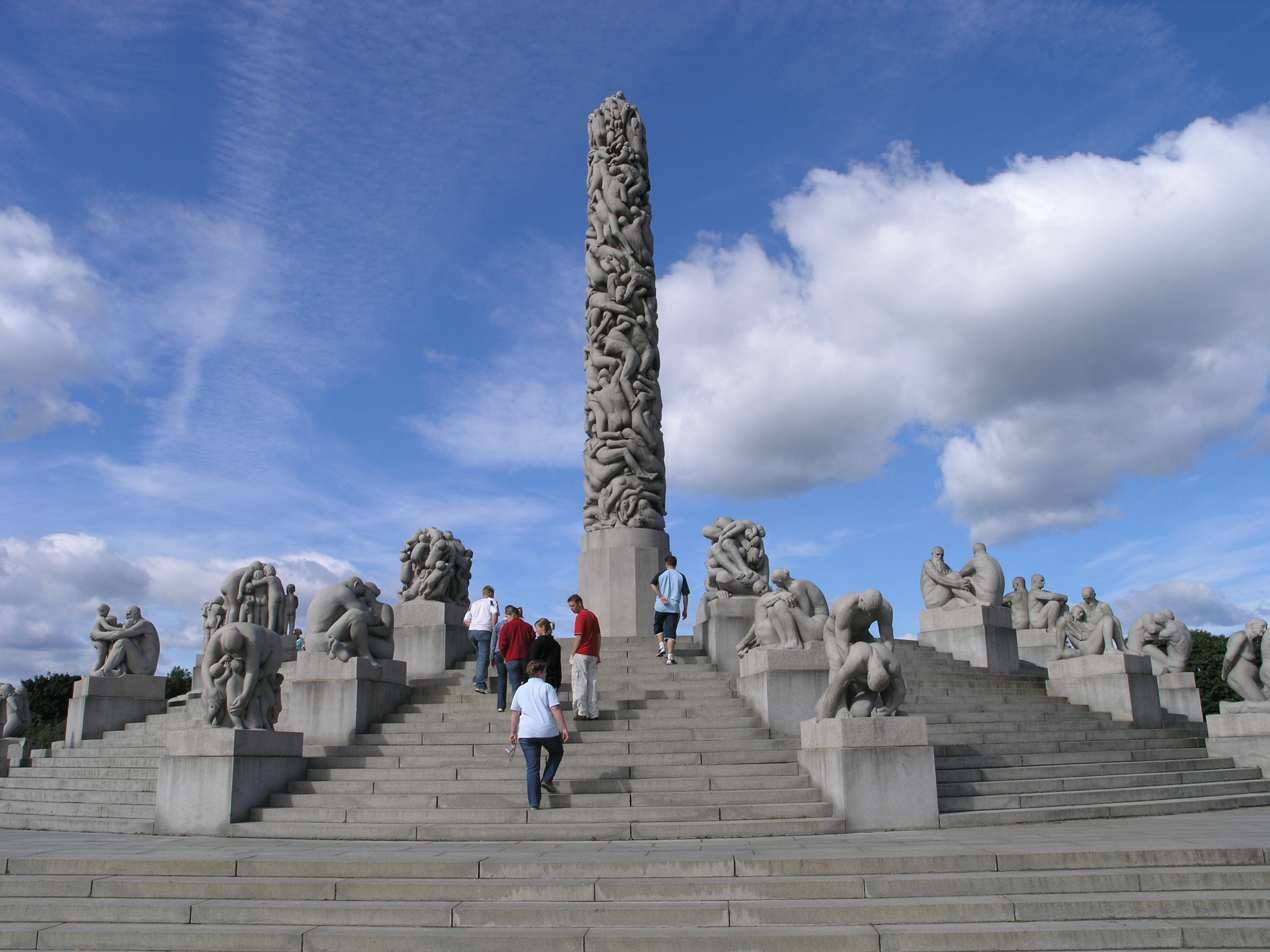
Vigeland sculpture garden in Oslo, Norway

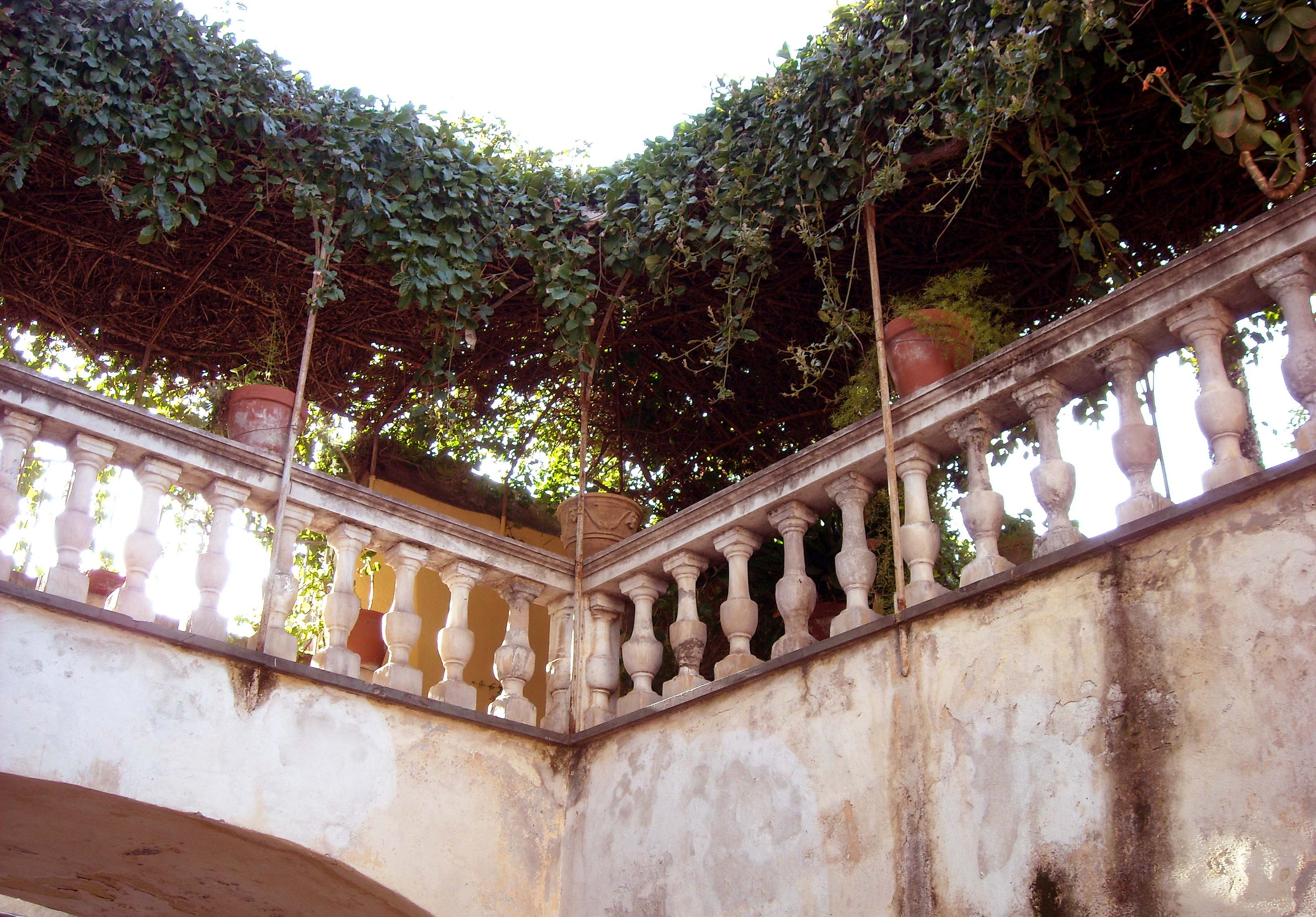
Roof terrace garden (Ventimiglia, Italy)

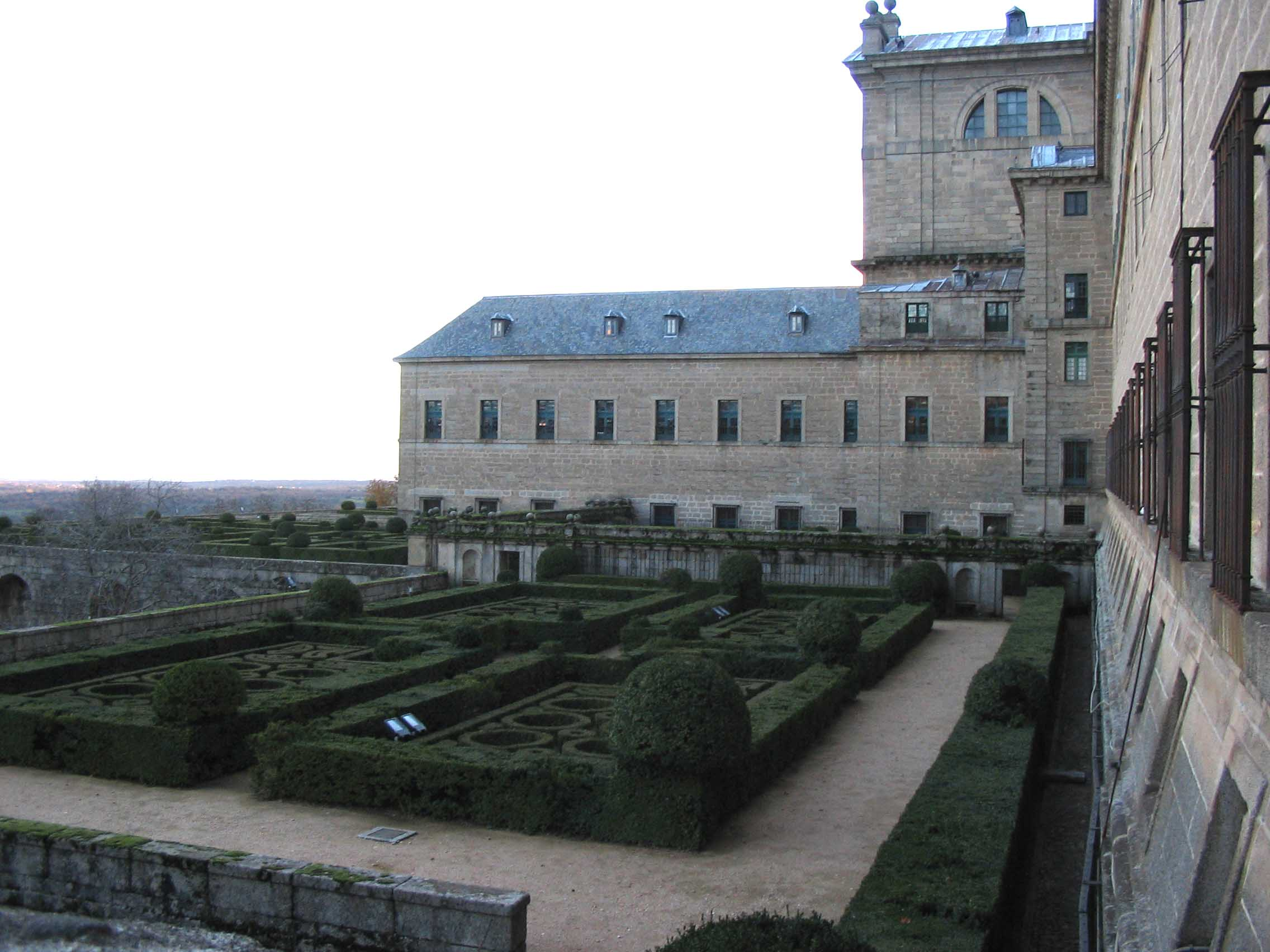
Escorial Formal palace garden in Madrid, Spain

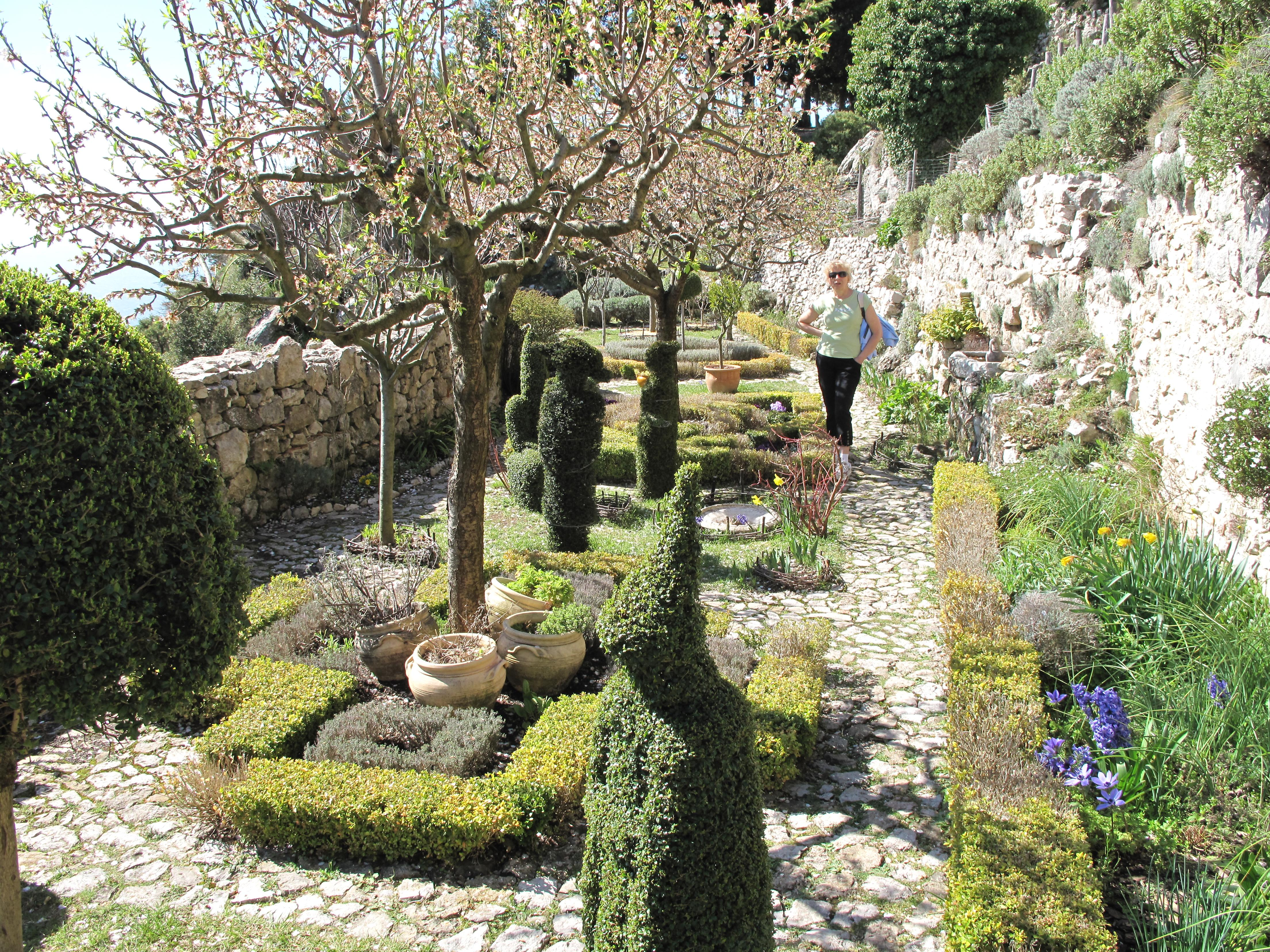
Mediterranean garden in Alpes-Maritimes, France

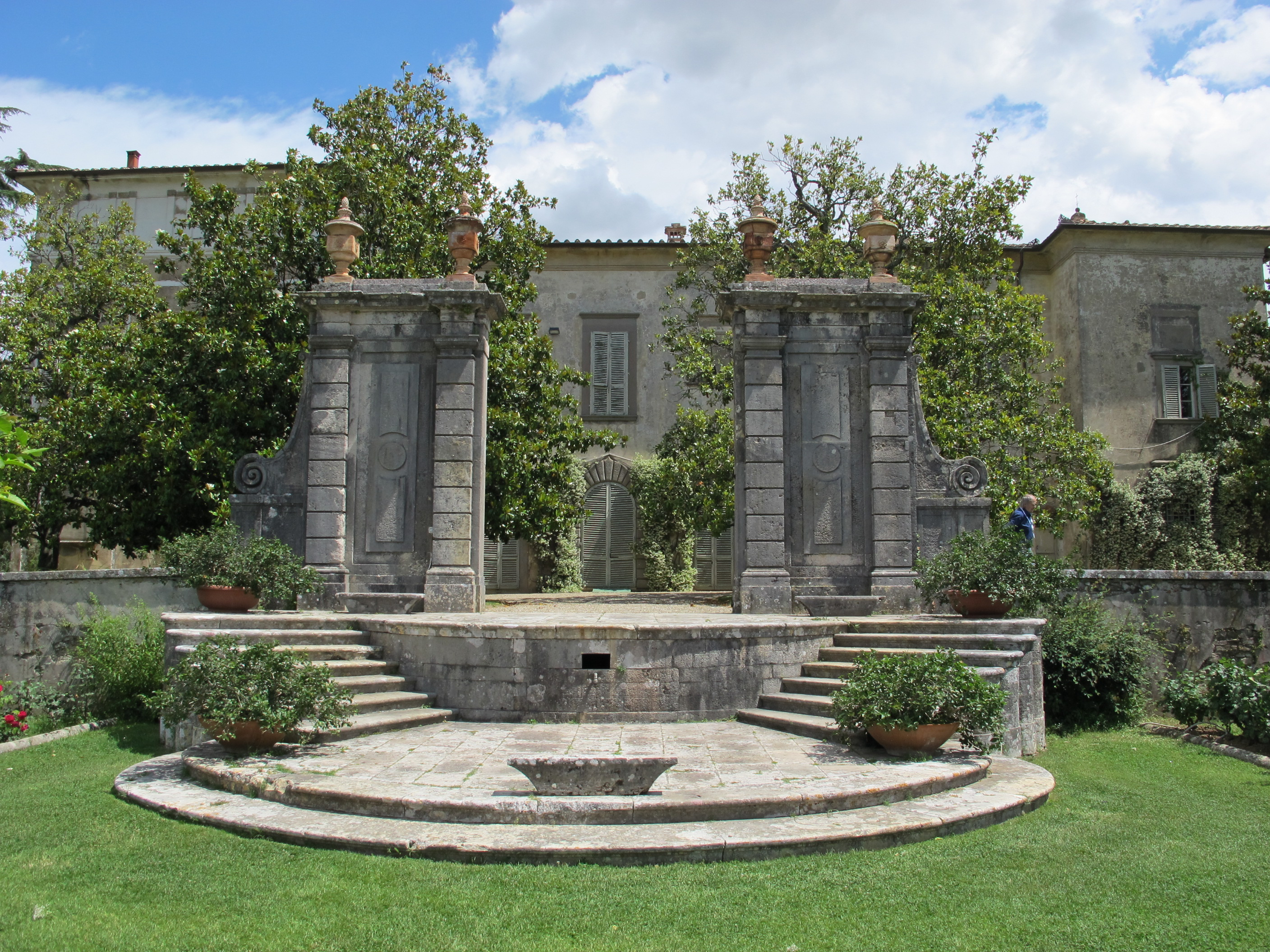
Use of steps at Villa la Magia, in Quarrata, Italy

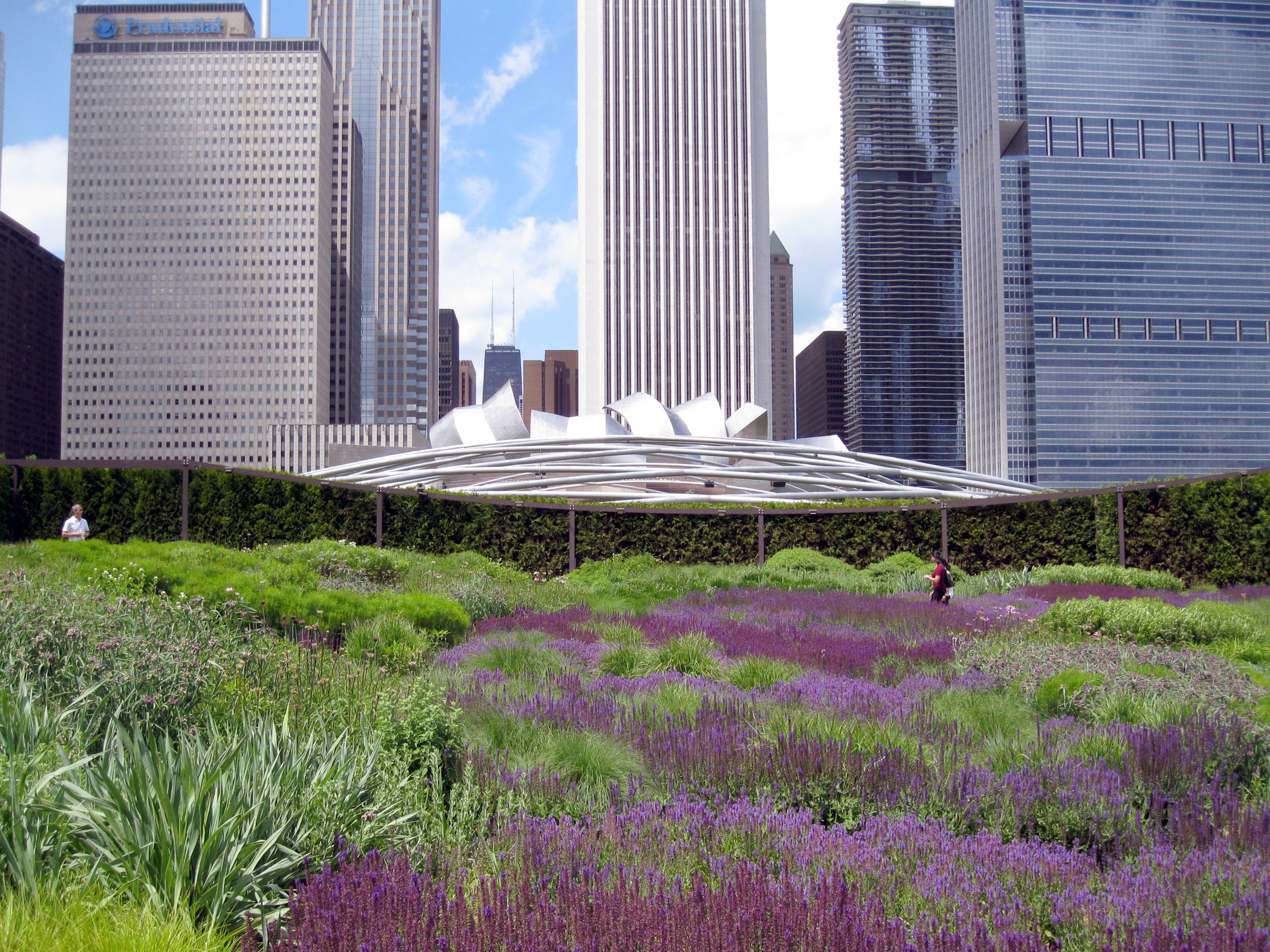
Lurie Garden in Chicago, Illinois, United States, GGN & Piet Oudolf

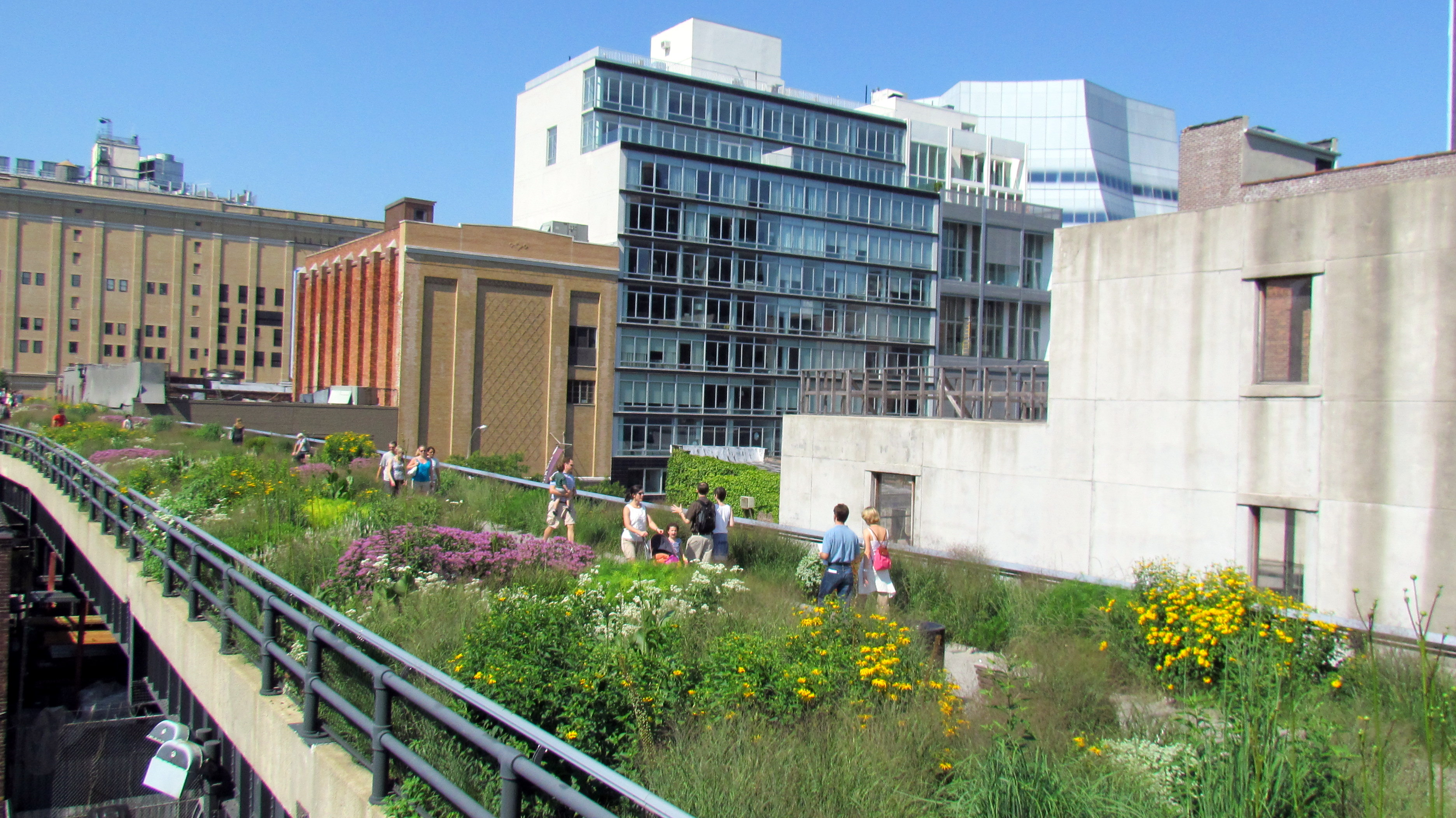
High Line (second section) A repurposed area in New York City, New York, United States

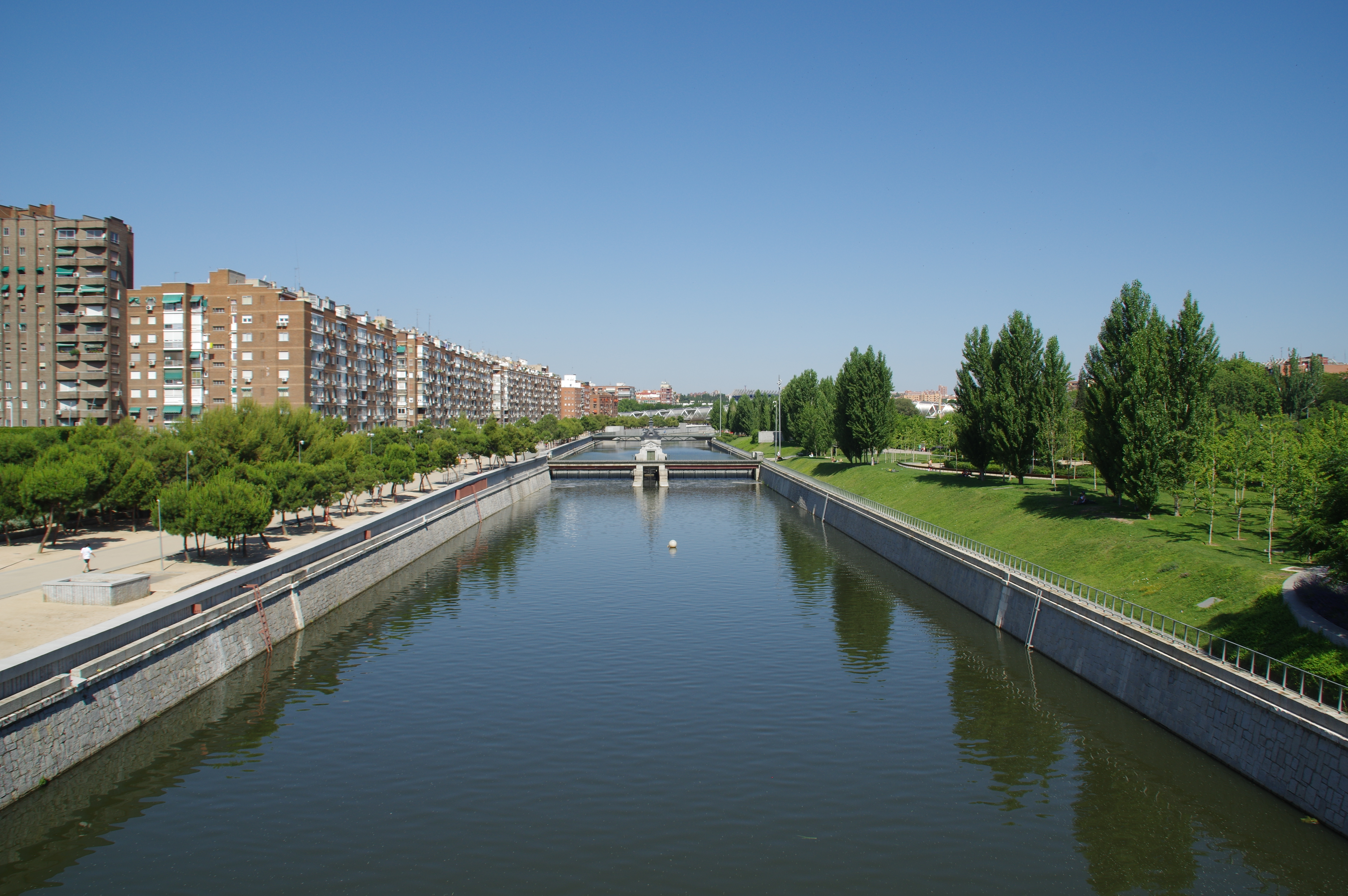
Parque Madrid Rio Formal use of water in Madrid, Spain

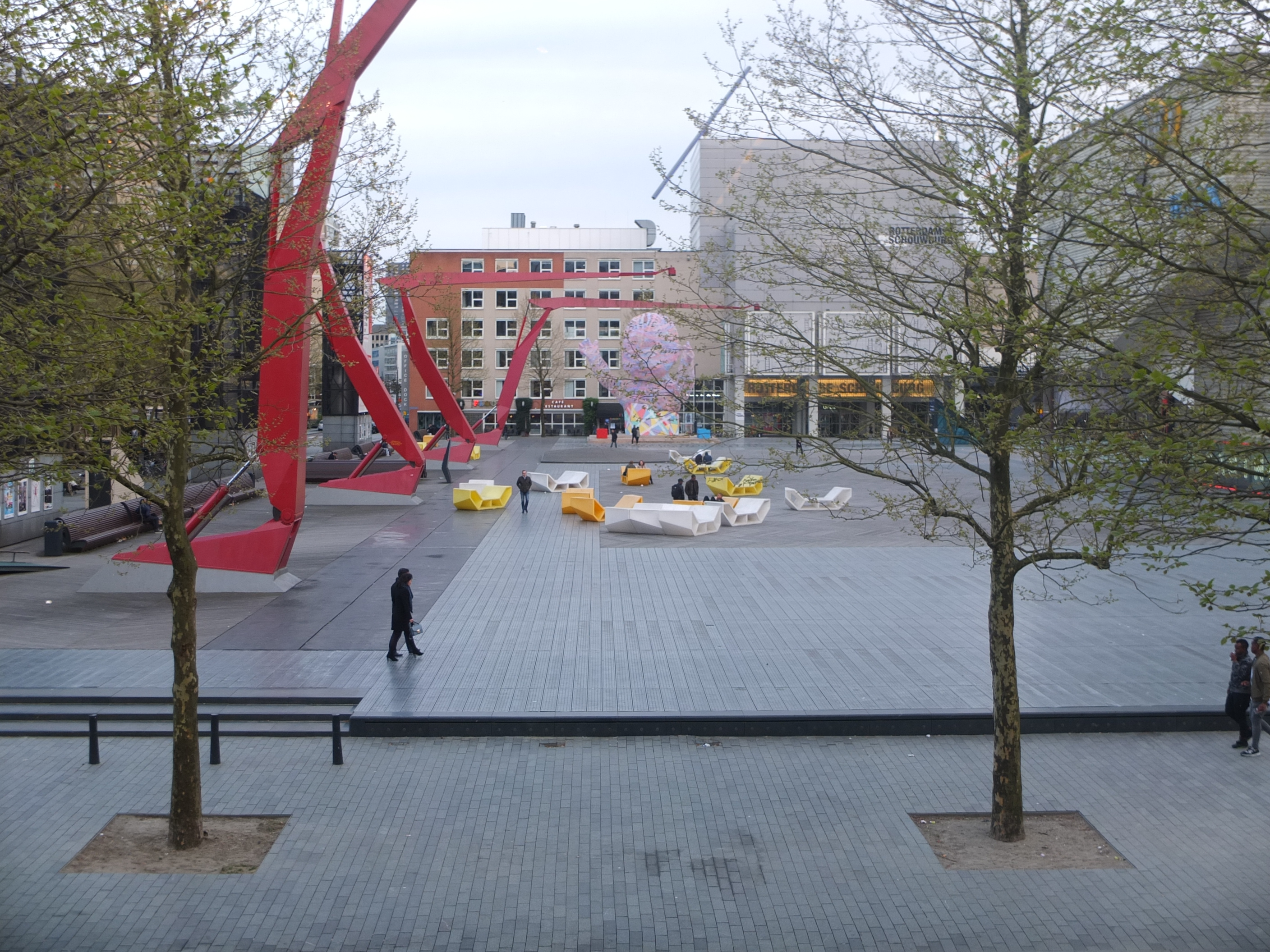
Schouwburgplein Urban park in Rotterdam, Netherlands

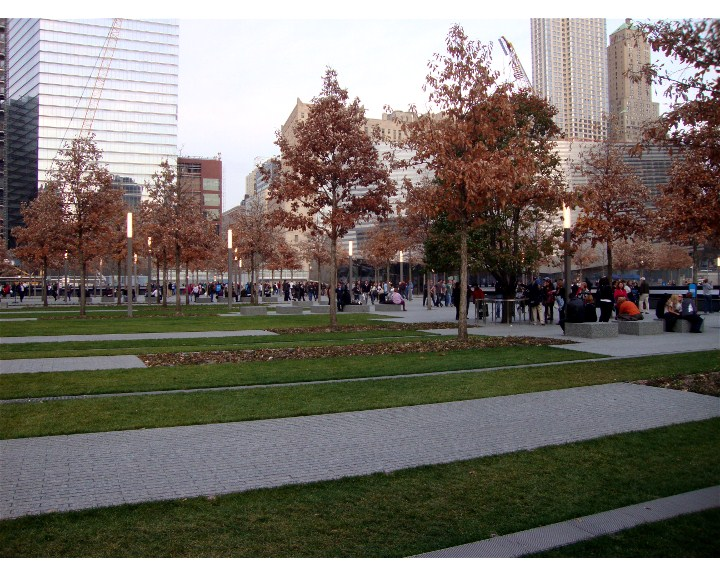
911 Memorial Park A memorial park in New York City, New York, United States

== See also ==
- Energy-efficient landscape design
- Environmental graphic design
- Green roof
- Hard landscape materials
- Landscape architecture design competitions
- Landscape detailing
- Landscape painting
- Landscape engineering
- Landscape products
- Landscape urbanism
- List of landscape architects
- List of schools of landscape architecture
- List of urban planners
- Planting design
- Principles of intelligent urbanism
- Soft landscape materials
- Sustainable landscape architecture
- Topocide
- Urban forestry
- Urban planner
- Urban reforestation
