= Landscape products =

Products used for landscaping

Landscape products are a group of building industry products used by garden designers and landscape architects and exhibited at trade fairs devoted to these industries. They include: walls, fences, paving, gardening tools, outdoor lighting, water features, fountains, garden furniture, garden ornaments, gazebos, garden buildings, and pond liners.

Geosynthetics are another group of products used extensively in landscape construction for drainage, filtration, reinforcement and separation. Geotextiles are used for drainage to either convey or allow water penetration and to prevent the mixing of two different materials; geomembranes are used to contain liquids in ponds or wastes in landfills; geogrids and geocells are used for load support and to increase the bearing capacity of weak soils; and geocells are used for slope and channel protection and erosion control.

The skills of combining these products to produce places are known as landscape design and landscape detailing.

== See also ==
- Garden design
- Soft landscape materials
- Hard landscape materials
