= Suzhou Polytechnic Institute of Agriculture =

Vocational college in Suzhou, Jiangsu, China

Logo of Suzhou Polytechnic Institute of Agriculture

Suzhou Polytechnic Institute of Agriculture (SPIA) (simplified Chinese: 苏州农业职业技术学院; traditional Chinese: 蘇州農業職業技術學院) is a provincial public vocational college in Suzhou, China.

SPIA was originally the Suzhou Government Agricultural School, founded in 1907 (the 33rd year of Guangxu's reign of the Qing Dynasty).

== History ==
In 2001, the school was upgraded to a vocational institution of higher learning and hence got its current name. In 2008, SPIA was approved to enter the list of "Demonstrative Higher Vocational Institutions of Jiangsu Province" under-construction.

The SPIA campus includes the Demonstrative Training Base for Rural Labor Shift under the State Council Leading Group Office of Poverty Alleviation and Development, and the Suzhou Training Center under the Chinese Ministry of Agriculture. According to the National Chronicle of Horticulture, SPIA's horticulture education dates back to 1912, being the earliest to offer this program among its counterparts in China. SPIA is the forerunner of vocational education in horticulture and gardening in modern China. In 2017, SPIA was approved to be listed as one of the High-level Vocational colleges in Jiangsu Province.

== Infrastructure ==
SPIA consists of the Main Campus, Xiangcheng Campus and Dongshan Campus, covering a total area of over 100 hectares. There are currently 35 diploma programs offered by the 9 teaching units, i.e. School of Horticultural Technology, School of Landscape Engineering, School of Economics & Management, School of Environmental Engineering, School of Smart Agriculture, School of Food Science and Technology, School of International Education, School of Continuing Education, and Center for Quality Education.

== Academics ==
SPIA Students are from 17 provinces, with a total of nearly 10,000 full-time students on campus. SPIA has over 550 faculty and staff members, including 191 with senior professional titles, 292 with master's or doctorate degrees, and more than 60 ranked as highly qualified personnel at the provincial or state levels.

SPIA has 2 "Provincial Excellent Teaching Teams", 6 "Provincial Brand-name Majors or Featured Majors", one "National Quality Course", 9 "Provincial Quality Courses", and one "National Quality Course Book" and 12 "Provincial Quality Course Books" . International exchanges and cooperation have been heartily carried out between SPIA and 18 sister schools from 8 countries.
