= Design competition =

Contest that solicits design proposals

A design competition or design contest is a competition in which an entity solicits design proposals from the public for a specified purpose.

== Types ==
=== Architecture ===
An architectural design competition solicits architects to submit design proposals for a building, bridge, or other structure. Such competitions may be open, receiving bids internationally, domestically, or regionally. The competition may occur in a single stage, or involve two stages, the first of which eliminates non-viable candidates.

Famous early examples of design competitions were for the Acropolis of Athens in 448 BCE, and the dome of the Florence Cathedral in 1418.

=== Coins and stamps ===
Coin and stamp design contests solicit designs to appear on the face of stamps and usually the obverse of coins. In 1998, the Royal Canadian Mint held the Millennium Coin Design Contest, a competition for the design of 24 quarters, one for each month of 1999 and 2000.

=== Government procurement ===
Specific rules are included in the EU's Directive on Public Contracts for the conduct of a design contest organised as part of a procedure leading to the award of a public contract or a design contest with prizes or payments to participants.

=== Monuments and sculptures ===
The design of artistic objects and monuments is a common subject in design competitions. A well-known example is the Vietnam Veterans Memorial in Washington D.C. designed by Maya Lin.

=== Urban space ===
Urban and landscape projects may solicit design proposals in a competition. Among them are projects for urban parks, streetscapes, and rehabilitation of natural areas.

=== Student design competition ===
A student design competition is a student competition to introduce students to real-world engineering practices and design.

== See also ==
- Public opinion
