= Space in landscape design =

Design theory

Space in landscape design refers to theories about the meaning and nature of space as a volume and as an element of design. The concept of space as the fundamental medium of landscape design grew from debates tied to modernism, contemporary art, Asian art and design as seen in the Japanese garden, and architecture.

== Europe ==
Elizabeth K. Meyer cites Claude-Henri Watelet's Essay on Gardens (1774) as perhaps the first reference to space in garden/architectural theory. Andrew Jackson Downing in 1918 wrote "Space Composition in Architecture", which directly linked painting and gardens as arts involved in the creation of space.

The origins of modern northern European thought is a German innovation of the 1890s. By the 1920s, Einstein's theories of relativity were replacing Newton's conception of universal space. Practitioners such as Fletcher Steele, James Rose, Garrett Eckbo, and Dan Kiley began to write and design through a vocabulary of lines, volumes, masses and planes in an attempt to replace the prevalent debate, centered around ideas of the formal and informal, with one that would more closely align their field with the fine arts.

According to Adrian Forty, the term "space" in relation to design was all but meaningless until the 1890s. At that time two schools began to develop. Viennese Gottfried Semper in 1880 developed an architectural theory based the idea that the first impulse of architecture was the enclosure of space. Camillo Sitte extended Semper's ideas to exterior spaces in his City Planning According to Artistic Principles (1889). Concurrently, Friedrich Nietzsche built on ideas from Kant which emphasized the experience of space as a force field generated by human movement and perception. Martin Heidegger would later contradict both of these schools. In his 1927 Being and Time and 1951 "Building, Dwelling, Thinking" he claimed that space was neither a construct of the mind nor a given, but was "that for which a room has been made" and was created by the object within a room rather than the room itself. Henri Lefebvre would call all of this into question, linking designers' notions of themselves as space-makers to a subservience to a dominant capitalist mode of production. He felt that the abstract space they had created had destroyed social space through alienation, separation, and a privileging of the eye.

James Rose and Garrett Eckbo, colleagues at Harvard in the 1930s, were the pioneers of a movement which adopted ideas about space from artists such as Wassily Kandinsky, Kurt Schwitters, Naum Gabo and the Russian Constructivists, and from architectural ideas based om Mies van der Rohe's free plan. Seeing gardens as outdoor rooms or sculptures to be walked through, they prioritized movement. In analogy to painting and sculpture, Rose in particular saw elements of landscape as having architectural volume, not just mass: "In pure landscape, we drop the structural shell and the volume is defined by earth, paving, water and ground cover; foliage, walls, structures and other vertical elements on the sides, and sky, branching and roofing above." Eckbo adopted the grid of columns and thin walls of the free plan to make a statement about the social function of the garden as a place where the individual and the collective coincide.

By the 1940s, writings about space in landscape design had proliferated. Siegfried Giedion, in his Space, Time and Architecture, reframed the history of architecture as that of the history of space. Ernő Goldfinger wrote several influential articles in Architectural Review addressing the subconscious effect of the sizes and shapes of spaces. He notes that perception of space happens in a state of distraction: we are required to move through a landscape in order to fully experience it. Dan Kiley absorbed these writings and built upon the work of Rose and Eckbo, promoting asymmetry over symmetry, balance over hierarchy, multiple centers, and figure-ground ambiguity.

== Minimalism ==
Minimalist art would have a profound influence on designers of the 1960s such as Peter Walker, Martha Schwartz, and Hideo Sasaki. On the one hand, Sol LeWitt's space-frame sculptures and Carl Andre's floor sculptures of mass-produced objects allowed a re-thinking of the necessity for walls in the formation of space. Geometry, repetition, and changes in ground plane created a "field of making" in which walls and even plantings were questioned as essential elements of landscape. Equally at issue in applied practice was the perception on the part of Sasaki that landscape had come to be seen as "open space", a white sheet of paper on which to display International Style buildings. This disconnection with the landscape was especially notable in corporate office parks, and Sasaki and Walker addressed this through an attempt to connect interior and exterior spaces.

James Corner considers landscape spatiality to be one of the three things that distinguish the medium of landscape (the others are landscape temporality and landscape materiality). He refers to Gaston Bachelard in emphasizing the role of scale and psychic location, which distinguish the space of landscape from that of architecture and painting: "the immediate immensity of the world from the inner immensity of the imagination, the inner space of the self".

Augustin Berque analyses landscape space by comparing Newtonian universal space and Cartesian dualistic space, in which there is a distinct separation between subject and object, and Chinese mediumistic space, in which a unity of landscape and environment corresponds to a unity of mind and body. Thus postmodern thought brings together the concepts of space as product of mind, body and culture. Rather than being the negative of the objects that occupy it, space can be seen as its own volume with undeniable importance as a design tool. In contemporary design, it is considered a palpable, lived phenomenon that contributes to our perception and experience of the world in subtle but often intentional ways.

== See also ==
- Genius loci
- Spirit of place
- Sense of place
- Roji-en Japanese Gardens
- Borrowed scenery
- Japanese rock garden
