= Landscape design =

Design profession

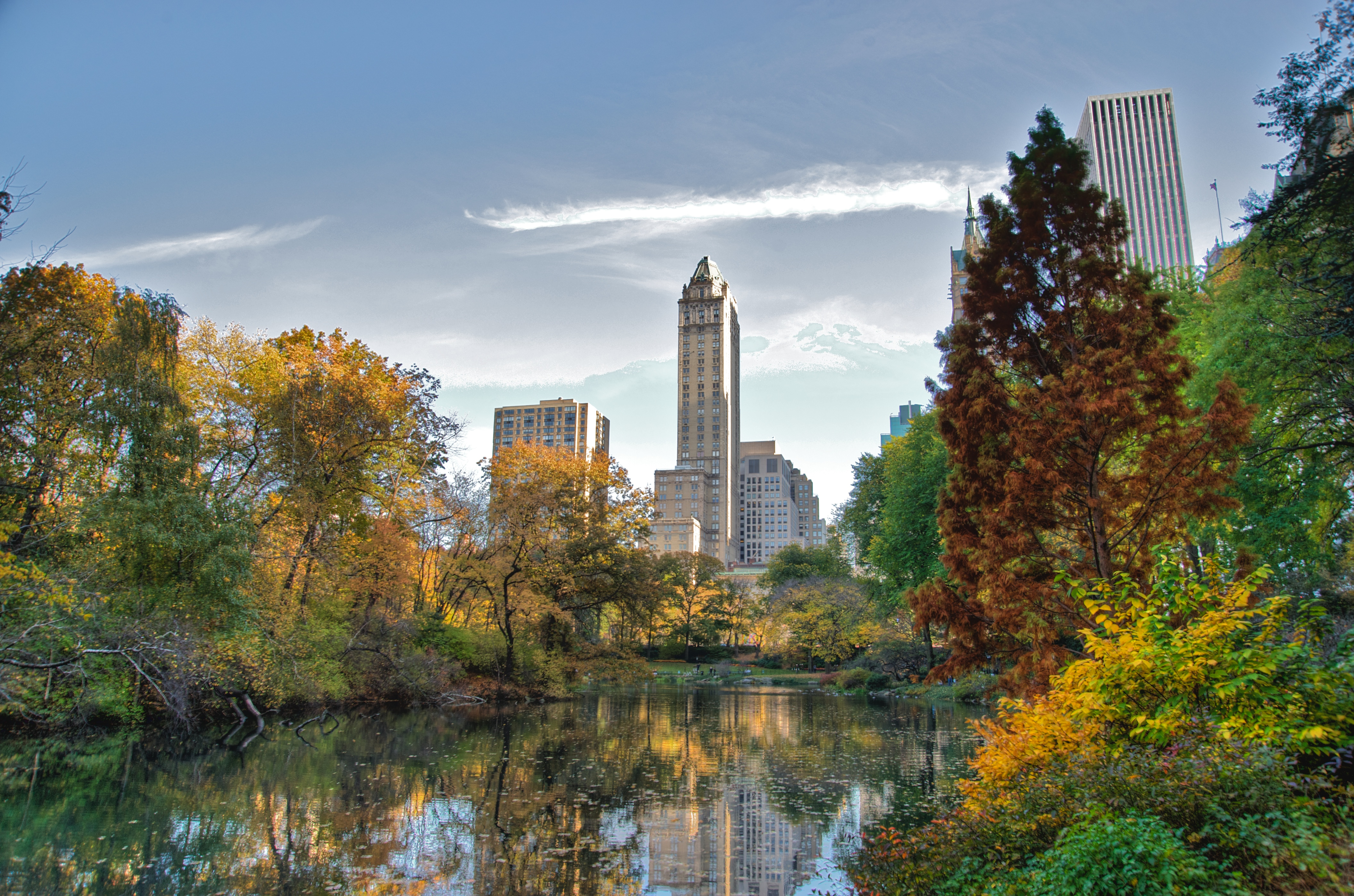
Central Park in Manhattan, the first landscaped urban park in the United States

Landscape design is an independent profession and a design and art tradition, practiced by landscape designers, combining nature and culture. In contemporary practice, landscape design bridges the space between landscape architecture and garden design.

== Design scope ==
Landscape design focuses on both the integrated master landscape planning of a property and the specific garden design of landscape elements and plants within it. The practical, aesthetic, horticultural, and environmental sustainability are also components of landscape design, which is often divided into hardscape design and softscape design. Landscape designers often collaborate with related disciplines such as architecture, civil engineering, surveying, landscape contracting, and artisan specialties.

Design projects may involve two different professional roles: landscape design and landscape architecture.

- Landscape design typically involves artistic composition and artisanship, horticultural finesse and expertise, and emphasis on detailed site involvement from conceptual stages through to final construction.
- Landscape architecture focuses more on urban planning, city and regional parks, civic and corporate landscapes, large-scale interdisciplinary projects, and delegation to contractors after completing designs.

There can be a significant overlap of talent and skill between the two roles, depending on the education, licensing, and experience of the professional. Both landscape designers and landscape architects practice landscape design.

== Design approach ==
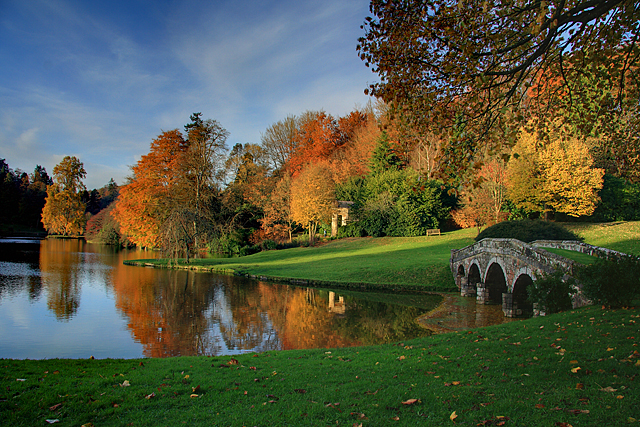
Autumn colours at Stourhead gardens

The landscape design phase consists of research, gathering ideas, and setting a plan. Design factors include objective qualities such as: climate and microclimates; topography and orientation, site drainage and groundwater recharge; municipal and resource building codes; soils and irrigation; human and vehicular access and circulation; recreational amenities (i.e., sports and water); furnishings and lighting; native plant habitat botany when present; property safety and security; construction detailing; and other measurable considerations.

Design factors also include subjective qualities such as genius loci (the special site qualities to emphasize); client's needs and preferences; desirable plants and elements to retain on site, modify, or replace, and that may be available for borrowed scenery from beyond; artistic composition from perspectives of both looking upon and observing from within; spatial development and definition – using lines, sense of scale, and balance and symmetry; plant palettes; and artistic focal points for enjoyment. There are innumerable other design factors and considerations brought to the complex process of designing a garden that is beautiful, well-functioning, and that thrives over time.

The up-and-coming practice of online landscape design allows professional landscapers to remotely design and plan sites through manipulation of two-dimensional images without ever physically visiting the location. Due to the frequent lack of non-visual, supplementary data such as soil assessments and pH tests, online landscaping necessarily must focus on incorporating only plants that are tolerant across many diverse soil conditions.

== Training ==
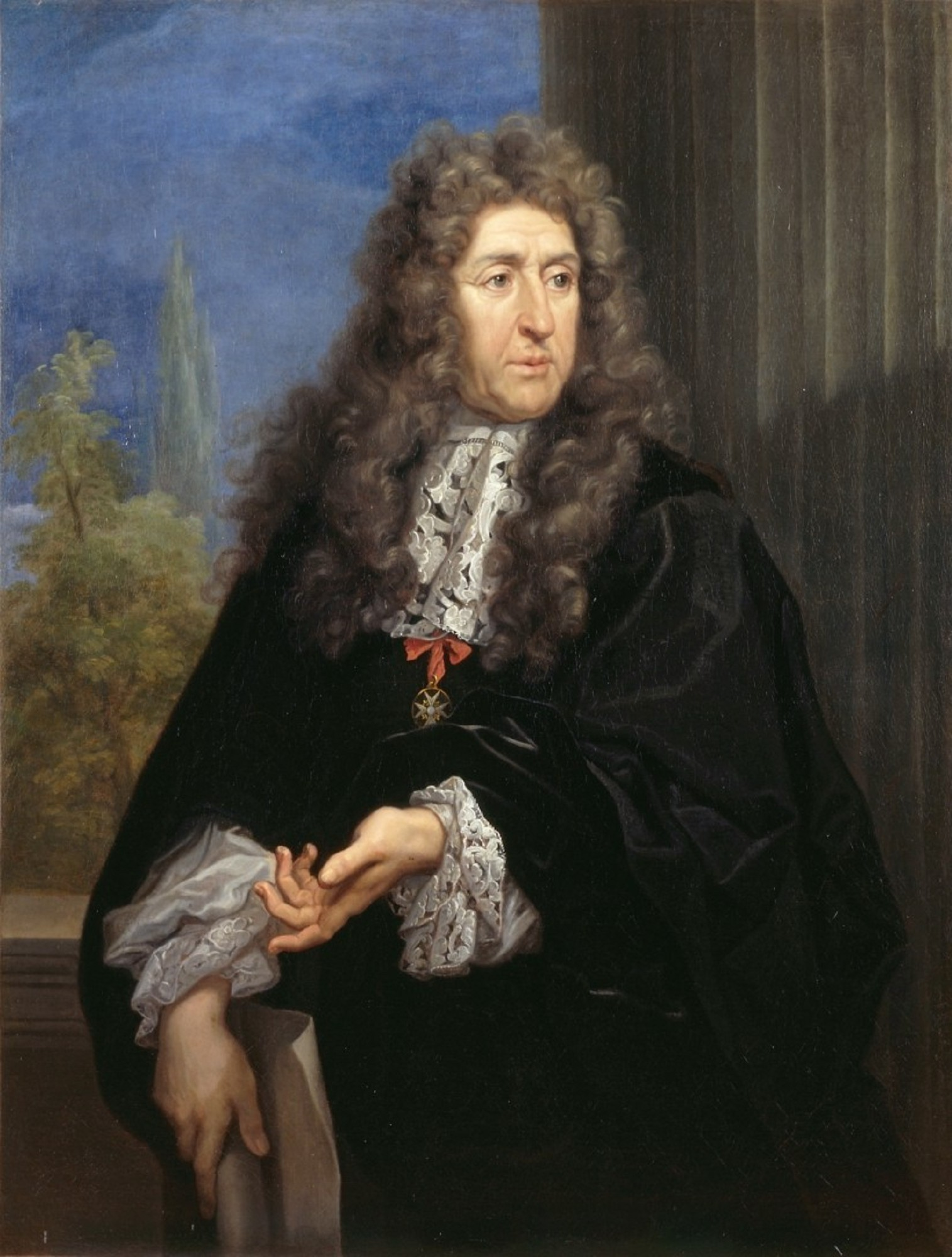
André Le Nôtre

Historically, landscape designers trained by apprenticing—such as André Le Nôtre, who apprenticed with his father before designing the Gardens of Versailles—to accomplished masters in the field, with the titular name varying and reputation paramount for a career. The professional section of garden designers in Europe and the Americas went by the name "Landscape Gardener". In the 1890s, the distinct classification of landscape architect was created, with educational and licensing test requirements for using the title legally. Beatrix Farrand, the sole woman in the founding group, refused the title, preferring Landscape Gardener. Matching the client and technical needs of a project, and the appropriate practitioner with talent, legal qualifications, and experienced skills, surmounts title nomenclature.

Institutional education in landscape design appeared in the early 20th century. Over time, it became available at various levels. Ornamental horticulture programs with design components are offered at community colleges and universities within schools of agriculture or horticulture, with some beginning to offer garden or landscape design certificates and degrees. Departments of landscape architecture are located within university schools of architecture or environmental design, with undergraduate and graduate degrees offered. Specialties and minors are available in horticultural botany, horticulture, natural resources, landscape engineering, construction management, fine and applied arts, and landscape design history. Traditionally, hand-drawn drawings documented the design and position of features for construction, but Landscape design software is frequently used now.

Other routes of training are through informal apprenticeships with practicing landscape designers, landscape architects, landscape contractors, gardeners, nurseries, and garden centers, and docent programs at botanical and public gardens. Since the landscape designer title does not have a college degree or licensing requirements to be used, there is a very wide range of sophistication, aesthetic talent, technical expertise, and specialty strengths to be responsibly matched with specific client and project requirements.

== Gardening ==
Many landscape designers have an interest and involvement with gardening, personally or professionally. Gardens are dynamic and not static after construction and planting are completed, and so in some ways are "never done". Involvement with landscape management and direction of the ongoing garden direction, evolution, and care depend on the professional's and client's needs and inclinations. As with the other interrelated landscape disciplines, there can be an overlap of services offered under the titles of landscape designer or professional gardener.

== See also ==
- Concrete landscape curbing
- Landscape assessment
- Space in landscape design
