= Landscape architecture design competitions =

Landscape architecture competitions are structured similarly to other types of design competitions (architecture, industrial design, graphic design etc.). In the case of landscape architecture design competitions, the procedure is sponsored by an organization or client that intends on implementing a new landscape design to a property in their care or ownership. Just as in architectural design competitions, the winning design is usually selected by an independent jury composed of design professionals and stakeholders such as government and/or local representatives. In general, design competitions are often used to stimulate new ideas in design, generate public debate, serve as a form of public relations for the project in question and integrate emerging designers into a more level field of competition.

In some countries, like Germany, landscape architecture competitions for public projects of a certain size are subject to fixed regulations concerning the scope and details of the competition and the overreaching procedure of tendering public contracts within a competition process. On the World Landscape Architect website they showcase in detail some of the large projects that have been successfully designed through design competitions. IFLA helps organize and execute design competitions for students.

== Competition types ==
Parallel to architectural design competitions, there are a number of different types of landscape architecture competitions:

- Open competitions
- Ideas competitions
- Single-stage or two-stage competitions
- Anonymous or cooperative competitions
- Student competitions

== Major historical landscape design competitions ==
Competition Name	Location	Year	Size	Winner(s)
Central Park	(United States) New York	1858	--	Frederick Law Olmsted and Calvert Vaux

== Noteworthy contemporary landscape architecture design competitions ==
Competition Name	Location	Year	Size	Winner(s)
National Mall	(United States) Washington D.C.	2012	--	Constitution Gardens: Roger Marvel Architects and Peter Walker and Partners; Washington Monument: OLIN and Weiss/Manfredi; Union Square: Gustafson Guthrie Nichol and Davis Brody Bond
Park am Gleisdreieck	(Germany) Berlin	2006	ca. 32 ha	Atelier Loidl
Markeroog	(Netherlands) Markermeer	2006	--	West 8
High Line	(United States) New York	2004	ca. 1 mile long	James Corner Field Operations, Diller Scofidio + Renfro, Piet Oudolf

== Landscape architecture and urban planning competitions ==
With larger landscape planning projects within urban or semi-urban contexts, part of the competition brief will often address concepts of urban planning and/or development of a master plan. Contemporary approaches to public space advocate mixed-use allocation of resources. That can mean that outdoor space must also serve other needs like recreational, athletic and cultural facilities, commercial facilities (like small shops and restaurants) among others, besides the conventional aspects expected of a planted and green environment.

Landscape architecture competitions often address the introduction of new or refurbishment of existing green space or the transformation and reuse of existing infrastructure (e.g., defunct industrial sites). When projects are inserted in urban areas, planners inevitably must integrate in their proposals aspects of urban planning like traffic planning, public utilities, and sociological factors like demographics and cultural context.
