= Soft landscape materials =

Vegetative materials in landscape architecture

The term soft landscape is used by gardeners and practitioners of landscape design, landscape architecture, and garden design to describe the vegetative materials which are used to improve a landscape by design. The corresponding term hard landscape is used to describe construction materials. The range of soft landscape materials includes each layer of the ecological sequence: aquatic plants, semi-aquatic plants, field layer plants (including grasses and herbaceous plants), shrubs, and trees. Soft landscaping can increase biodiversity in urban areas.

== See also ==
- Hedge (gardening)
- Herbaceous border
- Planting design
- Potting mix
