= Landscape engineering =

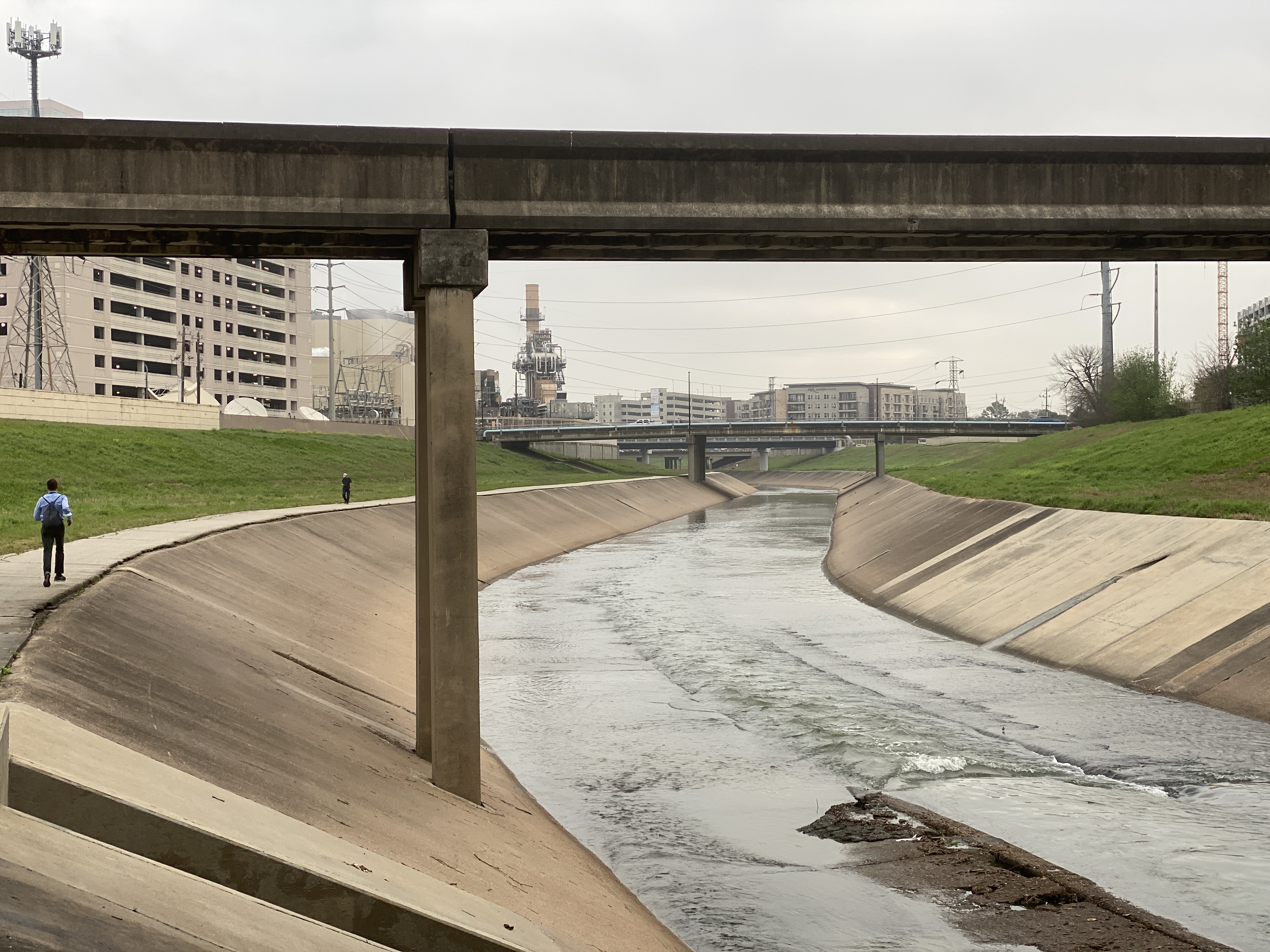
A river with functional (flood preventing) engineering (in Houston, Texas)

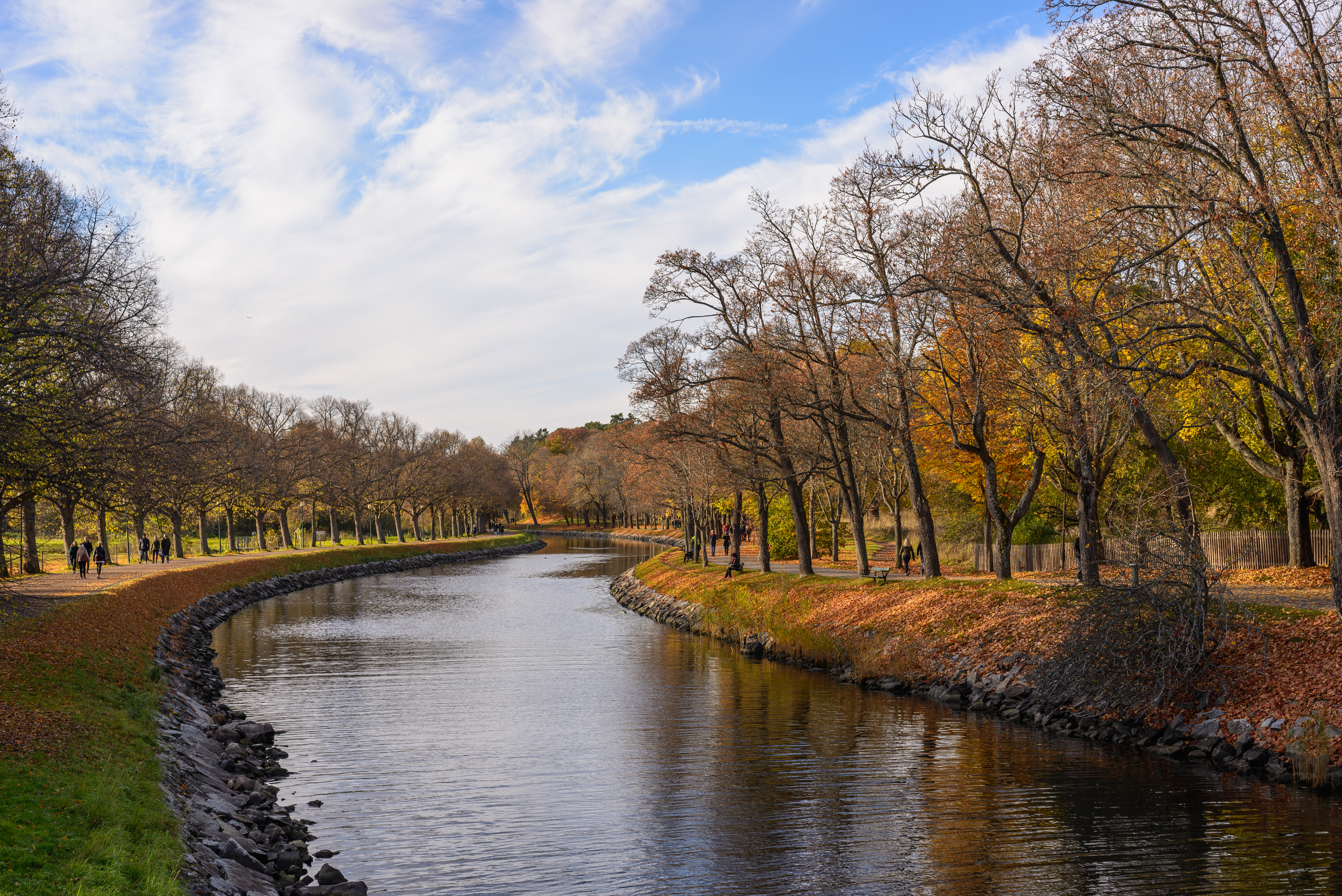
A canal design focused on esthetical landscape architecture (in Stockholm, Sweden) for comparison.

Landscape engineering is the application of mathematics and science to shape land and waterscapes. It can also be described as green engineering, but the design professionals best known for landscape engineering are landscape architects. Landscape engineering is the interdisciplinary application of engineering and other applied sciences to the design and creation of anthropogenic landscapes. It differs from, but embraces traditional reclamation. It includes scientific disciplines: agronomy, botany, ecology, forestry, geology, geochemistry, hydrogeology, and wildlife biology. It also draws upon applied sciences: agricultural & horticultural sciences, engineering geomorphology, landscape architecture, and mining, geotechnical, and civil, agricultural & irrigation engineering.

Landscape engineering builds on the engineering strengths of declaring goals, determining initial conditions, iteratively designing, predicting performance based on knowledge of the design, monitoring performance, and adjusting designs to meet the declared goals. It builds on the strengths and history of reclamation practice. Its distinguishing feature is the marriage of landforms, substrates, and vegetation throughout all phases of design and construction, which previously have been kept as separate disciplines.

Though landscape engineering embodies all elements of traditional engineering (planning, investigation, design, construction, operation, assessment, research, management, and training), it is focused on three main areas. The first is closure planning – which includes goal setting and design of the landscape as a whole. The second division is landscape design more focused on the design of individual landforms to reliably meet the goals as set out in the closure planning process. Landscape performance assessment is critical to both of these, and is also important for estimating liability and levels of financial assurance. The iterative process of planning, design, and performance assessment by a multidisciplinary team is the basis of landscape engineering.

Source: McKenna, G.T., 2002. Sustainable mine reclamation and landscape engineering. PhD Thesis, University of Alberta, Edmonton, Canada 661p.

== Example ==
An example of contemporary landscape engineering and natural resources management related to the Biosphere 2 and seawater farming projects, is the IBTS Greenhouse, formerly the Forest City designed for the Emirate of Ras al Khaimah. The IBTS rests on a thoroughly integrated design with more than 340 different engineering, science and technology disciplines. It was created for desert greening of hot, arid deserts and optimized for fresh water production from saline, or brackish water. The Integrated Biotectural System is based on a wetland, more specifically a mangrove eco-system designed for food and fodder production of 80tons per hectare and year, also called mariculture. The atmosphere inside the IBTS is turned into a potent water source and harvested with a combination of condensation utilities which makes it a more energy efficient desalination facility than industrial plants. It can produce 500.000m3 of distilled water per day while reclaiming 1000ha of hot arid desert lands. The electricity for the desalination is produced by an on-site forest of micro wind turbines located on the same footprint. These numbers are important because the performance data of for-profit engineered landscapes like wetlands for wastewater treatment or agro-ecological farming sites distinguishes technically feasible from financially and ecologically beneficial projects.

The IBTS is an example for sustainable landscape design that reclaims and recreates productive ecosystems including seawater farming, aquaculture, farming, forestry and residence for a human population. It has become feasible because of the design of a Bedouin Greenhouse-shape, automatic construction and maintenance of the vast membrane Sky-roof. The up-front and operational cost could thus be reduced so far that entire landscapes can be covered permanently, not in a common greenhouse fashion, but with an architectural structure that allows for a real-size forest and urban development below the Sky-roof.

The inherent concepts of the IBTS can be used to engineer, terra-form and activate deserts and other landscapes with harsh conditions. In 2015 the governor of Alaska received an offer for a fully self-sufficient multi-residence housing project based on the concepts developed for the IBTS project and adopted for arctic climate by the developer TS Prototype-Creation.

== Irrigation engineering degree founder ==
The father of the first irrigation engineering degree in the Americas was Louis George Carpenter (March 28, 1861 – September 12, 1935) He was a college professor and later the Dean of engineering & physics at Colorado State University formerly known as the Colorado Agricultural College. He was also an engineer, mathematician and an irrigation and consulting engineer.

It was there where Carpenter began the first organized and systematic college program for irrigation engineering starting in 1888. Those completing such instruction were awarded a bachelor of science degree in irrigation engineering.

Carpenter was one of the foremost leading experts on irrigation systems. During his life he investigated irrigation systems not only in North America but also in Canada and Europe. This led to his engineering consulting and water law. He became Colorado's state engineer which he held for several years while still teaching. Carpenter was involved in not only in irrigation engineering but consulting on hydraulic construction projects and the problems associated with such projects.

== See also ==
- Geotextile
- Hard landscape materials
