= Hard landscape materials =

Construction materials in landscape architecture

The term hard landscape is used by practitioners of landscape architecture and garden design to describe the construction materials which are used to improve a landscape by design. The corresponding term soft landscape materials is used to describe vegetative materials such as plants, grasses, shrubs, trees, etc. to improve landscape or outdoor space.

== Types ==
A wide range of hard landscape materials can be used, such as brick, gravel, rock or stone, concrete, timber, bitumen, glass, and metals.

Common gravel types include pea gravel and crushed granite gravel.

'Hard landscape' can also describe outdoor furniture and other landscape products.

== Advantages ==
Hard-landscape materials like gravel may avoid the need for mowing, watering, fertilizing, and pesticides. Gravel lawns may also be useful in regions where grass doesn't grow well due to insufficient sunlight.

== See also ==
- Landscape products
- Hardscape
