= The Science of Scenery =

2017 book by Andrew Lothian

- Cover
- Author: Andrew Lothian
- Language: English
- Subject: Landscape aesthetics, landscape assessment
- Genre: Non-fiction
- Publisher: CreateSpace
- Publication date: 2017
- Media type: Print (paperback)
- Pages: 480
- ISBN: 978-1-5346-0986-0
- Website: scenicsolutions.world/science-of-scenery-book/

The Science of Scenery: How We View Scenic Beauty, What It Is, Why We Love It, and How to Measure and Map It is a 2017 book by the Australian environmental planner Andrew Lothian.

Lothian traces the development of Western ideas of scenic beauty from antiquity to the present, summarises some 1,300 studies of landscape preference, and introduces his Lothian's Community Preferences Method, which measures and maps landscape quality by having members of the public rate standardised photographs. His central argument is that the beauty of a landscape is subjective but can be measured objectively through surveys. The book was reviewed in journals of tourism, landscape architecture, perception and geography.

== Summary ==
Lothian thinks that the beauty of a landscape lies in the perception of those who view it rather than in the land itself, and that this subjective quality can nonetheless be measured objectively by surveying the preferences of groups of people. He defines landscape quality as "the human subjective aesthetic perception, both positive and negative of the physical landscape responding to its land forms, land cover, land uses, the presence of water, and other attributes", and classifies scenic beauty as "an environmental, social and economic resource for a nation". The aim of his book, he reveals, is to "contribute to the scientific analysis of landscape quality so that it may be better understood, measured, mapped, and managed". The book starts with a psalm and a foreword by Ian Bishop, a prominent researcher in the field. In the introduction, scenery is presented as something free to enjoy and not diminished by being enjoyed, and in the second chapter Lothian describes his assessment of the Lake District in England as a worked example before the book focuses on history and theory.

The first part, "How we see scenic beauty", is more than half of the book. Here Lothian tracks Western ideas of landscape from classical Greece and Rome to the present. He frames its chapters as a succession of "eyes" (divine, symbolic, philosopher's, human, inner, sublime, artist's, living, explorer's, accountant's, doctor's and child's), each looking at scenery through one field, and ends the part with a chapter that synthesises them. Through these eyes he covers religion and culture, the aesthetics of traditional societies including Australian Aboriginal views of land, the philosophy of aesthetics, Gestalt and colour perception, psychoanalysis, the appreciation of mountains, landscape painting, designed gardens and the pastoral landscape, the economic pricing of scenery, the health benefits of landscape, and water, which he calls "the secret ingredient". In the philosophy of aesthetics chapter he shows how philosophers have moved over the past 2,000 years from viewing landscape beauty as a physical entity in the landscape to the realisation that it is a subjective quality in the mind, - beauty lies not in front of our eyes but behind our eyes in our mind.

In the second part, "What and why we love scenic beauty", Lothian moves from the history of national and international interest in scenery through theories and typologies of landscape aesthetics to two chapters on empirical landscape quality research of the 20th and 21st centuries. In these chapters, he summarises some 1,300 studies, based partly on Google Scholar searches, in running text and summary tables. He then condenses the findings into 16 points, among them that people of different cultures share "similar landscape preferences" and that "natural and agricultural land uses are invariably preferred to urban, industrial or commercial uses".

In the third part of the book, Lothian explains the Community Preferences Method, which he developed using studies conducted in regions of Australia and in the Lake District in England. The researcher divides a study area into landscape units and photographs them under standardised conditions. Lothian gives guidance on focal length, format, composition, sun elevation, weather, features to keep out of the frame, and post-processing. Respondents, often through an online survey of around 150 images, rate the photographs on a scale from one (low) to ten (high), and the ratings are analysed statistically and mapped across the region. Lothian estimates that a typical project takes about 1,500 hours, of which roughly 50 go to data analysis, and supplies sample survey instruments for others to adapt. A second chapter in this final part covers visual impact and landscape change, much of it concerned with renewable energy and the siting of wind farms.

Lothian dedicates the fourth and final part's single chapter to summarise the book and proposes a 28-point strategic plan for protecting landscape quality based on the European Landscape Convention, set alongside photographs of ten of the world's highest-rated landscapes based on a survey of 45 of the world’s best landscapes drawn from the World Heritage List. His examples in the book come mainly from Australia and Britain, with some from the United States, and includes more than 800 photographs, many of them taken by the author himself.

== Reviews and critical reception ==
In his review, A. Asbjørn Jøn found the Community Preferences Method well presented and detailed enough to put into practice, and the arguments easy to follow, though he wanted a complete worked example. (Note: Which actually is presented - the Lake District survey comprises Chapter 2.) He suggested that the academic contribution of the first 19 chapters “may seem superficial”. He defended them as preparation for the method and said their bibliographies would take interested readers further. Jøn recommended the work to anyone with an interest in landscape aesthetics and to those looking for a way to assess landscape quality. He called the book “a welcome addition to the field that prompts further discussion and thought”.

Richard C. Smardon called the second part of the book an “exhaustive summary” of landscape assessment research and wrote in his review that no other publication compiled as much of it. Lothian’s history of Western landscape aesthetics covers more ground than any other Smardon knew of; the nearest was a collection of essays edited by Allen Carlson and Sheila Lintott. He thought other assessment approaches, Terry Daniel’s scenic beauty estimation model for one, deserved more space. He recommended it to landscape managers and practitioners, and as a reference for upper-level undergraduate and graduate courses in planning, geography and landscape architecture.

Claus-Christian Carbon wished the photographs were available in very high resolution. Yet he found the systematic photographic procedure alone reason to read the book from beginning to end. He called the resulting data “a treasure for vision scientists working in the field of empirical aesthetics”, few of whom had studied natural beauty systematically. Carbon liked the way Lothian switched between being a philosopher, an everyday beholder, a marketer of scenic regions and a statistician. He compared the book to “a cookbook” for anyone surveying the aesthetics of scenery on a broad scale. Later editions, he suggested, could add recent neuroscience and research on how familiarity and time change aesthetic appeal.

Lauren Judge found that Lothian’s approach treated beauty as purely visual, cut off from “affect, narrative, or other sensory experiences”. She saw room for a fuller account, and questioned whether scenic beauty should be measured at all. She warned that unappealing but ecologically sensitive places could be neglected if only the landscapes a majority found attractive were preserved, and that authorities might use the method to decide what to “preserve, develop, or sacrifice for economic benefits”. Judge conceded that “to quantify a concept like beauty takes courage”, and that Lothian had shown how individual, regional and social influences shaped Western readings of the environment. She wanted the historical survey to look beyond Anglo-European ideas. (Note: Chapter 4 covers the aesthetic symbolism of landscapes by the Australian Aborigine, New Zealand Māori, traditional Chinese and the Tibetan cultures.)

Rudi van Etteger called the book a “life work” and, for a beginning researcher, “the ultimate starting point”. The book, he objected, conflated scenic quality with the wider notion of landscape quality, limited perception largely to sight and favoured the picturesque over the sublime. Van Etteger argued from the environmental aesthetics of Allen Carlson, Arnold Berleant and Yuriko Saito that judging landscapes from static photographs leaves out bodily engagement with the environment and the value of everyday places, so the method might serve tourism and marketing better than landscape architecture.

== See also ==
- Aesthetics of nature
- Biophilia hypothesis
- Environmental psychology
- Landscape assessment
- Landscape planning
