= Public open space =

Classification of space in the environment

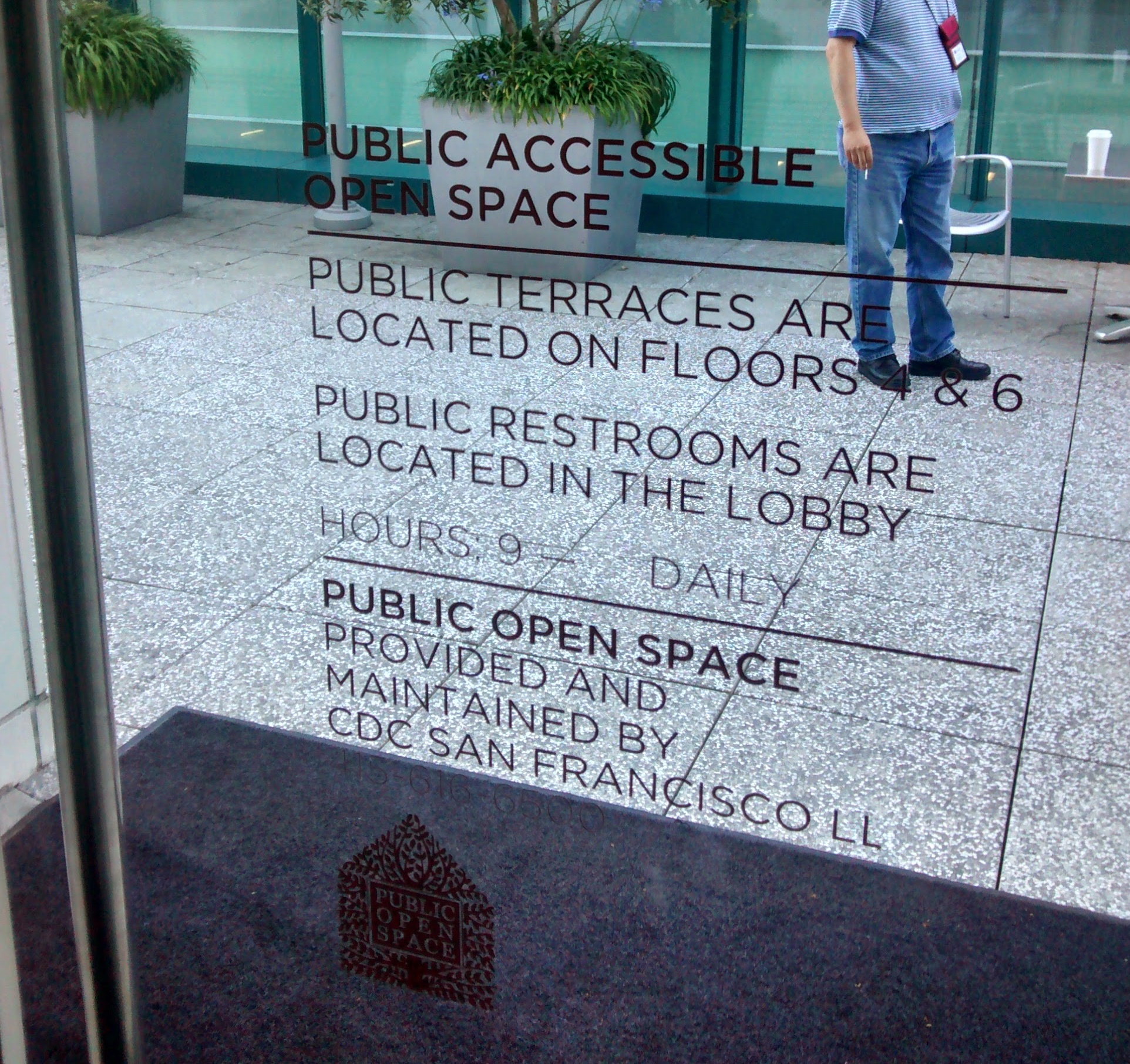
Public Open Space sign in San Francisco (a terrace of a hotel, a privately owned public space)

Public open space is often referred to by urban planners and landscape architects by the acronym 'POS'. Varied interpretations of the term are possible.

'Public' can mean:

- owned by a national or local government body
- owned by 'public' body (e.g. a not-for-profit organization) and held in trust for the public
- owned by a private individual or organization but made available for public use or available public access, see privately owned public space (POPS)

'Open' can mean:

- open for public access
- open for public recreation
- outdoors, i.e. not a space within a building
- vegetated

Depending on which of these definitions are adopted, any of the following could be called Public Open Space:

- a public park
- a town square
- a greenway which is open to the public but runs through farmland or a forest
- a public highway
- a private road with public access

== See also ==
- Environmental good
- Landscape architecture
- Landscape planning
- Public good
- Public space
