= Everyday Aesthetics =

Philosophy subfield

Everyday Aesthetics is a recent subfield of philosophical aesthetics focusing on everyday life, events, settings and activities in which the faculty of sensibility is saliently at stake. Alexander Baumgarten established Aesthetics as a discipline and defined it as scientia cognitionis sensitivae, the science of sensory knowledge, in his foundational work Aesthetica (1750). This field has been dedicated since then to the clarification of fine arts, beauty and taste only marginally referring to the aesthetics in design, crafts, urban environments and social practice until the emergence of everyday aesthetics during the ‘90s. As other subfields like environmental aesthetics or the aesthetics of nature, everyday aesthetics also attempts to countervail aesthetics' almost exclusive focus on the philosophy of art.

== Grounding aesthetics in experience ==
Aesthetic inquiry on everyday life owes much of its approach to John Dewey’s (1934) pragmatist aesthetics, even if he was interested in grounding mainly artistic experience. Dewey pointed at a variety of circumstances in which sensibility is present emphasizing the importance of feeling, energy, and rhythm in every creature's intercourse with its environment. He thus stressed not only the artistic but the everyday doings and undergoings that involve alertness and intensity of experience. Dewey explored aesthetics from the subjects' experience rather than from objects' status as artworks and museum collections. This turn would allow overcoming object-centric approaches to aesthetics that hindered any consideration of the aesthetic beyond artistic and beautiful things justifiable by intrinsic qualities categorized as aesthetic.

== Social dimension of everyday aesthetics ==
The neglect of aesthetic theory to consider the role of sensibility in everyday life was first pointed out by Katya Mandoki who in 1994 coined the word Prosaics (drawing a distinction from Aristotle’s Poetics focused on art) to denote a sub-discipline that would specifically inquire the aesthetics involved in daily activities emphasizing the styles and forms of expression in face-to-face and context determined interactions. Prosaics or the theory of everyday aesthetics analyzes in this and subsequent texts the social conventions on what is considered acceptable or not by implicit standards of taste in each institutional setting (school, family, religion, politics, artworld, medical practice, sports). Six books and several articles i.e. Everyday Aesthetics; Prosaics, social identities and the play of culture (2007) consistently analyze the wide spectrum of the non-artistic within personal and collective experience. The role of the aesthetic is examined through symbolic interaction, identity negotiation and dramaturgical performance to produce specific sensitive effects and impact upon sensibility. As a multi-sensorial phenomenon, prosaics pays attention to the whole range of sensorial display for affecting participants' sensibility (body language, the visual, setting and props, intonation and styles of language) and not only sight and hearing as has been customary in aesthetics.

== Political dimension, violence and negativity in everyday aesthetics ==
An approach to everyday aesthetics involves both the positive and negative, the enriching and the toxic effects operating on sensibility. Joseph H. Kupfer brought to the attention of aesthetic inquiry the importance of focusing on the effects of violence and ultraviolence in modern society. Kupfer makes explicit the aesthetic ground of violence in society and emphasizes destruction as an aesthetic process producing vivid sensations. He highlighted also the need of incorporating aesthetics to education not only by means of teaching art but aesthetically, i.e. in the manner itself of educating through the rhythm, organization of subject matter, and method of presentation to engage students with the content of study. Mandoki points at the negative use of aesthetics for manipulating emotions in the political sphere and refers to Nazi propaganda as a case in point that exemplifies the deliberate use of aesthetics for exerting violence. The utilization of aesthetics for political agendas, specifically in the legitimation of the nation-state is dealt by this author. Arnold Berleant has stressed the negative aspect of everyday aesthetics pointing at the importance of the aesthetic impact of terrorism as well as the use of aesthetics in the political sphere. Berleant brings up other extreme situations that provoke perceptual injury or damage as contemporary urban overcrowding and visual over stimulation, space pollution, claustrophobic and oppressive conditions. For Berleant, aesthetics implies active, intense aesthetic engagement and is thus involved in both positive and negative effects of everyday contemporary urban settings. For Berleant aesthetics of the environment has been a sustained object of research for more than two decades. Since 1970, he has insisted on the importance of aesthetics as a field of experience and active engagement in which our quality of life depends.

== Beauty in daily life, environmental aesthetics and artification ==
Yi-Fu Tuan proposed that we should apply the traditional aesthetic categories of beauty, contemplation, disinterestedness, and distancing in valuing daily life through different non artistic objects and locations. In 1974 he insisted on the need of paying due attention to the environment as object of aesthetic appreciation. Along this line Crispin Sartwell also proposed in 1995 applying aesthetics to life itself. Yuriko Saito, an environmentalist aesthetician specializing in Japanese aesthetics, argues for paying attention to weather as worthy of aesthetic appreciation and for making moral and aesthetic judgments on everyday artifacts, landscapes, lawns, and neighborhood eyesores that are conflicting with the harmony of the environment. Saito advocates a self-critical artification of everyday life and warns about the risks of artificating business. Paulina Rautio has performed qualitative analysis by interviews and epistolary exchange with women in regards to their experience of beauty through non artistic items and their contexts such as hanging laundry in Lapland where the opportunity of drying clothes under the sun is rare. There is a common interest in this approach for understanding aesthetics as a theory of art and beauty following traditional categories and at the same time attempting to go beyond conventional borders of art by artificating the non art and extending its scope to everyday objects, environments and to living itself. That is the case of Horacio Pérez-Henao who tries to interpret literature under the scope of everyday aesthetics by pointing out how fictional characters experience aesthetics into their daily lives.

== Sports and food as art ==
Every work of art has, since the Renaissance, tried to expand themes worthy of artistic expression and concepts of artistic value to include new subject matters, techniques and styles in painting and sculpture, new harmonies, consonances or dissonances in music, new attitudes, gestures, and different genres and requirements of quality. However the initiative of applying the concept of art literally to non artistic activities within a theoretical framework related to everyday aesthetics came from philosophers like David Best, Wolfgang Welsch and Lev Kreft proposing to consider sports as an art form. Feminist aestheticians are also advocating for the inclusion of other senses beyond the two traditional sight and hearing, as in taste (Carolyn Korsmeyer) and smell (Emily Brady), that can render aesthetic experiences in daily life. Carolyn Korsmeyer, M. Quinet and Glenn Kuehn argue for including food among aesthetically relevant objects and experiences.

== The categories of the ordinary as aesthetic ==
Another line emerging from analytic aesthetics and the American Society for Aesthetics has been lately discussing the expansion of aesthetics’ category repertoire to include other qualities (cuteness, prettiness, messiness, neatness, cuddliness, loveliness, organized, disorganized) as well as other types of ordinary experiences (i.e. scratching an itch, playing with a pencil).
