= Landscape assessment =

Landscape assessment is a sub-category of environmental impact assessment (EIA) concerned with quality assessment of the landscape. Landscape quality is assessed either as part of a strategic planning process or in connection with a specific development which will affect the landscape. These methods are sub-divided into area-based assessments or proposal-driven assessments, respectively. The term 'landscape assessment' can be used to mean either visual assessment or character assessment. Since landscape assessments are intended to help with the conservation and enhancement of environmental goods, it is usually necessary to have a fully geographical landscape assessment as a stage in the process of EIA and landscape planning.

During the initial phases of a project, such as site selection and design concept, the landscape architect begins to identify areas of opportunity or setbacks that may provide constraints. The architect prepares alternative options in order to compare their assessments and identifies the proposals which allow for the least adverse effects on the landscape or views. A landscape professional works with a design team to review potential effects as the team develops a sustainable proposal. Upon developing a design proposal, the landscape professional will identify and describe the landscape and visual effects that may occur and suggest mitigation measures to be taken in order to reduce negative effects and maximize benefits, if any.

== Landscape and visual impact assessment (LVIA) ==
This process, which operates within the larger framework of Environmental Impact Assessment, strives to ensure that any of the effects of change are taken into account in the decision-making process of a project. It is essential that any possible change or development to the landscape or views around a project be evaluated throughout the planning and design phase of a project. Thus, landscape assessment is sub-divided into two types: visual assessment and character assessment.

=== Visual assessment ===
This would look at how changes in the landscape could alter the nature and extent of visual effects and qualities relating to locations and proposals and how they affect specific individuals or groups of people. Guidance on the preparation of these assessments is given in the 3rd edition of the Guidelines for Landscape and Visual Impact Assessment published by Routledge on behalf of the Landscape Institute & Institute of Environmental Management, 2013.

=== Character assessment ===
This includes assessment of the effect of a development or proposal on the character of the landscape. Typically the character of the landscape, resulting from a combination of aspects such as geology, hydrology, soils, ecology, settlement patterns, cultural history, scenic characteristics, land use etc., has previously been set out in a Landscape Character Assessment. The landscape assessment, as part of LVIA, is the formal examination of how this character may be affected, typically in order to inform development management decisions. This is because landscape character can be affected without a noticeable visual effect.

== Area-based assessment ==
This assessment can be completed at the regional scale as well as district, city, or catchment scale. This process is used to determine a baseline and also guide landscape management. The process consists of three stages: landscape description, landscape characterization, and landscape evaluation.

=== Landscape description ===
The first step in completing an area-based assessment is to compile data in order to identify components of the landscape within a project area. Components of a landscape range from landform, geology, soil, vegetation cover, drainage patterns, built development, land uses, infrastructure, and heritage sites to cultural meaning. This step in the assessment of a landscape is not site specific, but instead, a general description of the landscape.

=== Landscape Character Assessment (or Landscape characterisation) ===
This step in the assessment refers to the process of identification, mapping, and description of landscape character areas and/or types. Landscape character areas are unique named geographical areas made up by a combination of individual landscape components (and possibly types) that make one area different from another area and which are recognised by the community. Landscape character types are more generic in nature and represent areas of shared characteristics. The characterisation of a landscape should begin to define the boundaries of the area being assessed. For more information see Landscape Character Assessment.

=== Landscape evaluation ===
The last step in an area-based assessment is the evaluation process. This is a critical phase in the assessment process because landscape evaluations are the driving force behind landscape design, planning and management and development management. Here, the assessment should identify important landscapes or natural features and assign rankings and priorities to features that require management.

The Australian environmental planner Andrew Lothian bases the evaluation on public preference rather than on the assessor's own judgement. In his Community Preferences Method, set out in The Science of Scenery (2017), respondents rate standardised photographs of each landscape unit from one (low) to ten (high), and the ratings are analysed statistically and mapped across the study area.

=== Drawback ===
The evaluation process in the assessment is subjective and dependent on the person completing the assessment and the extent of community involvement or reference to suitable evaluation criteria. Evaluations can therefore sometimes be controversial, particularly when they may limit development ambitions. Therefore, the assessment should always be completed by professionals who are trained to make accurate judgments of a landscape.

== Proposal-driven assessment ==
Landscape quality can be assessed in connection with a specific development which will affect the landscape. Such assessment requires that a professional submit a development proposal. This approach to complete an assessment serves to identify the potential effects on landscape values brought forth by a certain proposal. The specific proposal is analyzed to evaluate the effects it may have on the landscape or character of the landscape, as well as the proposal's effect on the composition of available views. In a proposal-driven assessment, the area involved should include the site of the project as well as its immediate surroundings.

This assessment should produce a detailed description of any physical changes to the landscape as well as a description and analysis of the effect these changes will have. This process should evaluate the importance of character, landscape, and visual amenity. Ultimately, this approach is effective if, and only when measures that can mitigate the effect of a given development proposal are identified.

== See also ==
- Landscape architecture
- Collective landscape
- Environmental Good
