= Seascape =

Work of art which depicts the sea

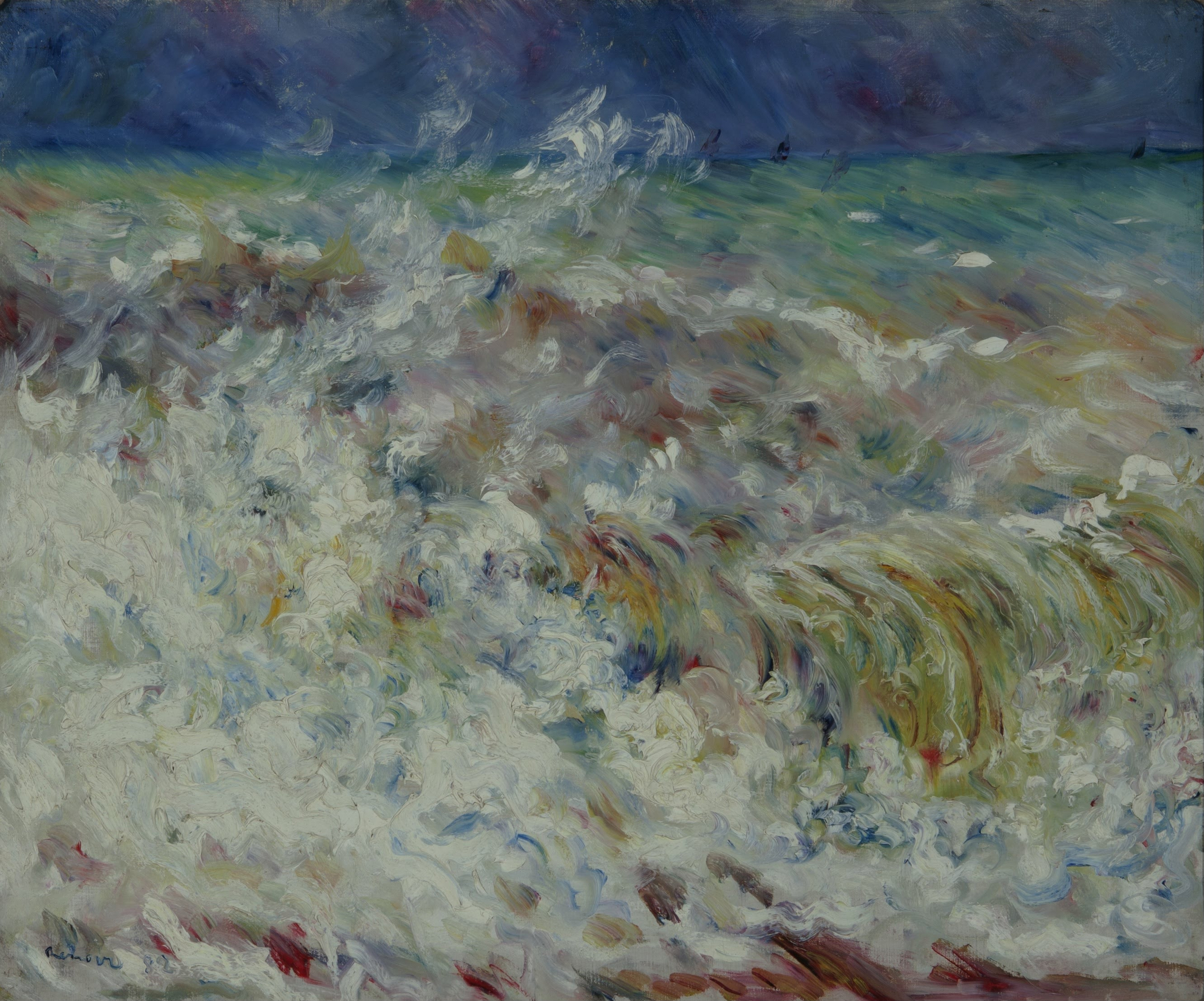
The Wave by Pierre-Auguste Renoir

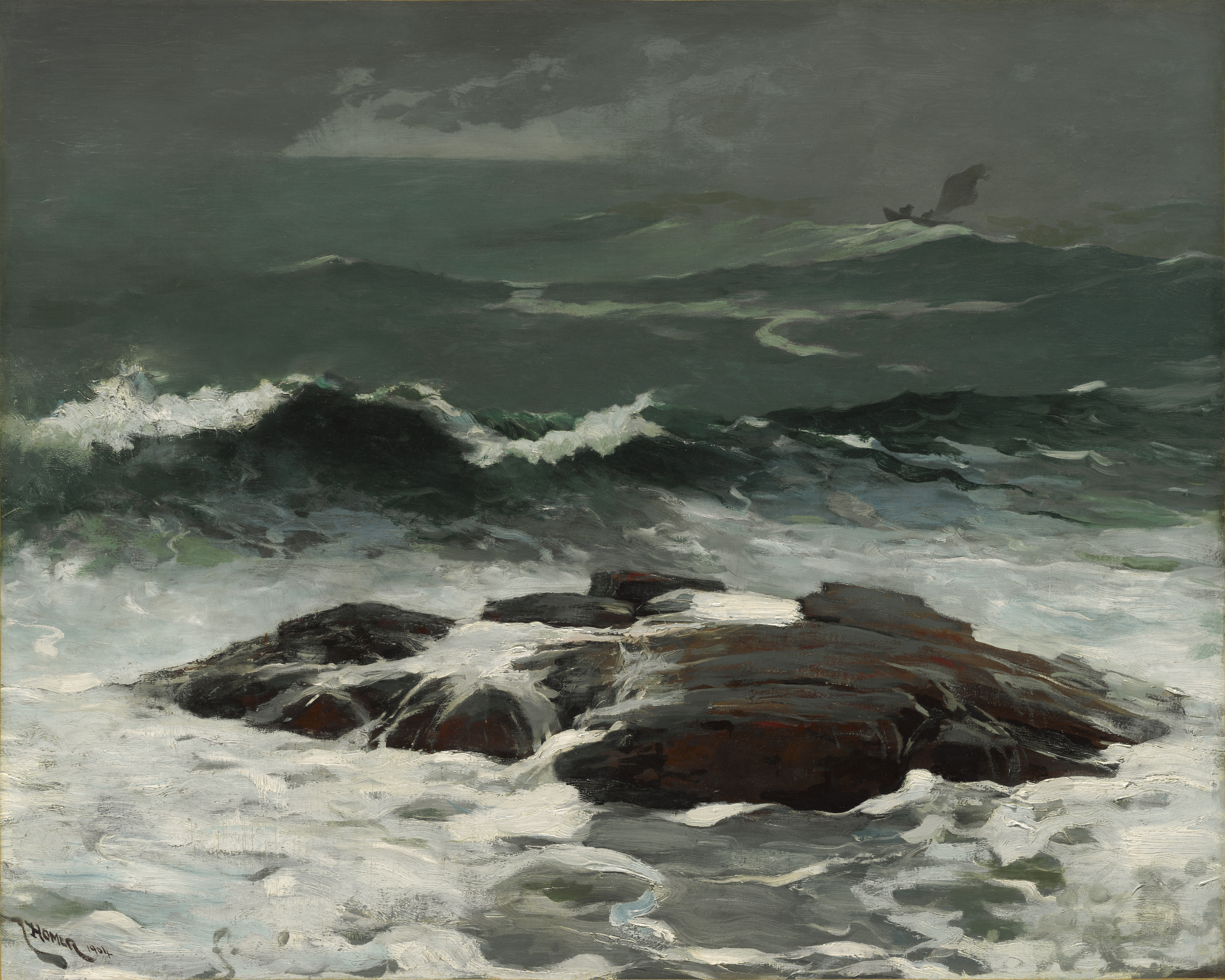
Summer Squall, 1904. A seascape by Winslow Homer.

A seascape is a photograph, painting, or other work of art which depicts the sea, in other words an example of marine art. The word originated as a formation from landscape, which was first used for images of land in art. By a similar development, "seascape" has also come to mean actual perceptions of the sea itself. It is applied in planning contexts to geographical locations possessing a good view of the sea. Seascape aesthetics receive legal protection in terms of biodiversity/ health of the seas (the OSPAR Convention, and in terms of the visual bio-cultural seascape (European Landscape Convention).

== History ==
The word seascape was first recorded and coined in 1790. Smithsonian noted in 2016 that the first use it found was 1804. The term was modelled after the word landscape. The word remains in use for works of art mainly showing open sea (often with shipping on it), as well as for views of the sea.

== Planning use ==
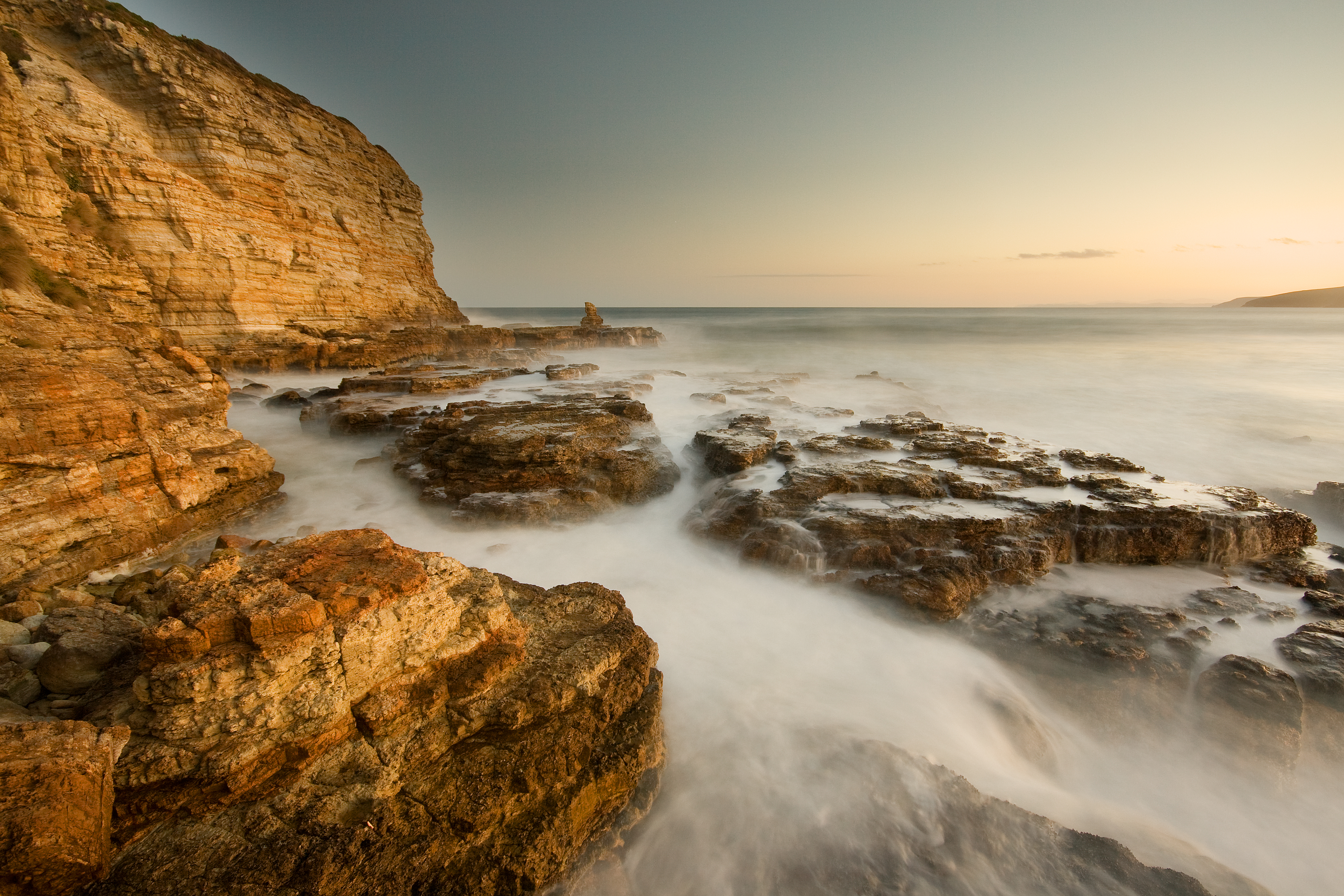
A seascape photograph at Clifton Beach, South Arm, Tasmania, Australia

In the UK a seascape is defined in planning and land use contexts as a combination of adjacent land, coastline and sea within an area, defined by a mix of land-sea inter-visibility and coastal landscape character assessment, with major headlands forming division points between one seascape area and the next. This approach to coastal landscape planning was developed jointly by Government environmental bodies in Wales (UK) and Ireland in 2000 to assist spatial planning for (at that time new) offshore wind farm developments. The resulting "Guide to best practice in seascape assessment" have since been adapted and applied in Scotland and Wales for guidance to offshore wind farm developers and for carrying out spatial planning assessments.

Meanwhile, the word has also been adopted in England referring to the historic and archaeological character areas of the sea – a different but complementary methodological approach encompassing what lies beneath the sea surface. This use of the word departs from the focus on scenery and visual perception, relying instead just on cognitive perception (what lies beneath the sea surface is out of sight to most of us).

The Welsh language distinguishes between 'Morluniau' (seascape in the traditional sense of a picture, view or painting), and 'Morweddau' (seascape as a distinct, geographical area exhibiting particular characteristics and qualities). There is no such distinction in the English language.
