= Amenity =

Quality of a certain property

In property and land use planning, amenity (lat. amoenitās “pleasantness, delightfulness”) is something considered to benefit a location, contribute to its enjoyment, and thereby increase its value.

Tangible amenities can include the number and nature of guest rooms and the provision of facilities such as elevators (lifts), internet access, restaurants, parks, community centres, swimming pools, golf courses, health club facilities, party rooms, theater or media rooms, bike paths or garages.

Intangible amenities include well-integrated public transport, pleasant views, nearby activities, and a low crime rate. Within the context of environmental economics, an environmental amenity can include access to clean air or clean water, or the quality of any other environmental good that may reduce adverse health effects for residents or increase their economic welfare, while in a legal context, "loss of amenity" refers to the practical convenience and lifestyle advantages which may have been provided by an asset, when damages are claimed because the asset cannot be used.

Residential real estate can benefit from amenities which, in turn, boost property value. Some examples of valuable amenities are proximity to parks and schools, updated fixtures, and bonus living spaces. These additional features that make a home desirable can add substantial value to a property.

== Public amenities ==
- Banks and post offices
- Cheap and easy access to utilities such as electricity, water, natural gas and internet
- General and specialized shops and markets
- Hospitals, clinics, and other medical facilities
- Libraries
- Local buses and railway stations and airports and ferry terminals
- Play schools and schools, colleges and universities
- Parks, beaches and public areas
- Roads with easy access to highways

== Mobile amenities ==
Mobile amenities may visit some sites, including:

- Food truck
- Auto washing and detail service
- Oil Change
- Fuel Service
- Retail Sales Vehicle
- Mobile Repair Truck (Bike Repair, Golf Clubs)
- Mobile Hair / Nail Salon
- Mobile Dentist
- Mobile Maid
