= Mandoki =

Mandoki is a Hungarian surname, a person from Mándok. Notable people with the surname include:

- Leslie Mándoki (born 1953), German-Hungarian musician
- Luis Mandoki (born 1954), Mexican film director
- Katya Mandoki (born 1947), Mexican women writer and artist
