= Aesthetics of nature =

Subfield of philosophical ethics

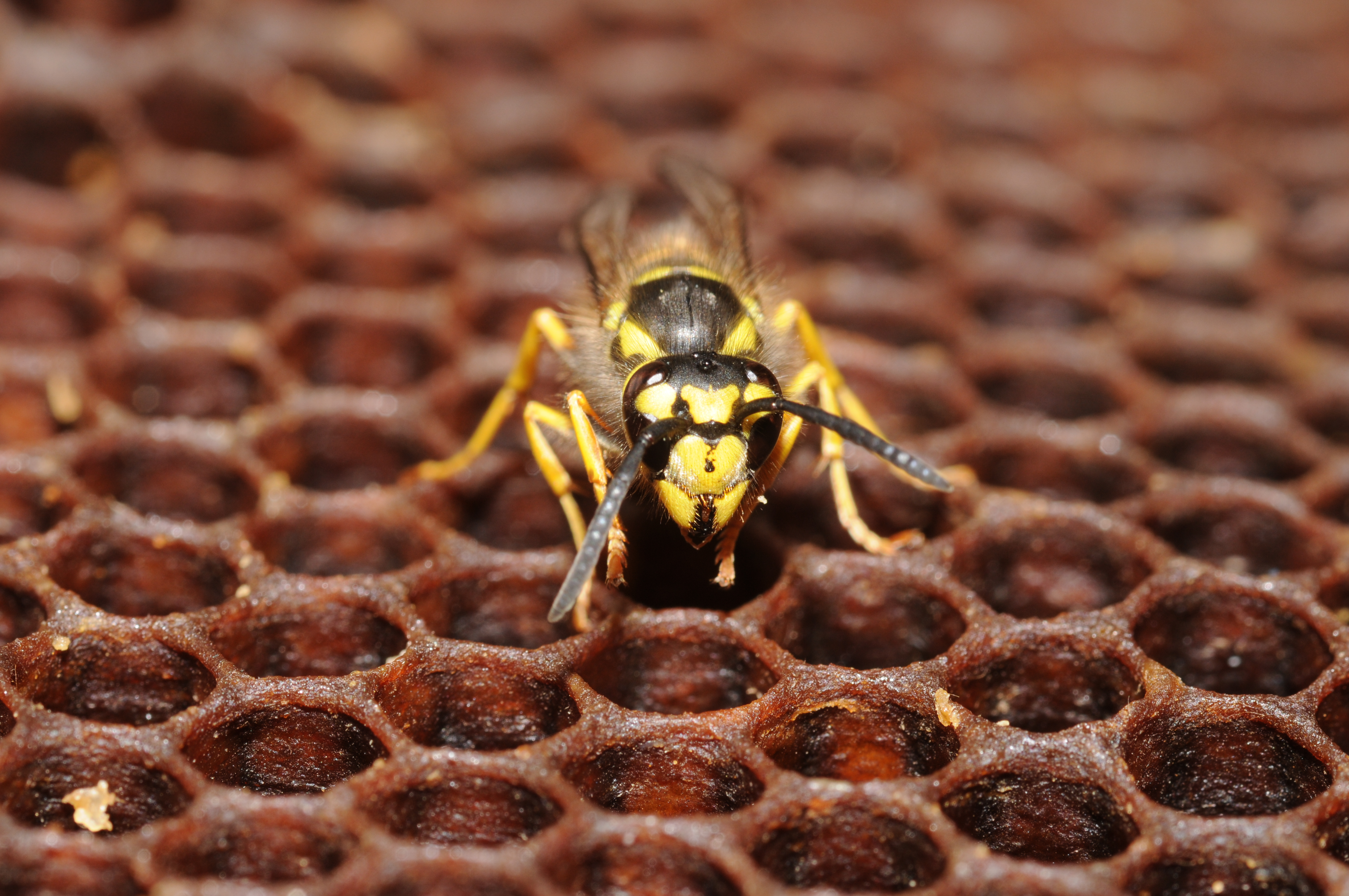
Wasp on a bee honeycomb

Aesthetics of nature is a sub-field of philosophical ethics, and refers to the study of natural objects from their aesthetical perspective.

== History ==
Aesthetics of nature developed as a sub-field of philosophical ethics. In the 18th and 19th century, the aesthetics of nature advanced the concepts of disinterestedness, the pictures, and the introduction of the idea of positive aesthetics. The first major developments of nature occurred in the 18th century. The concept of disinterestedness had been explained by many thinkers. Anthony Ashley-Cooper introduced the concept as a way of characterizing the notion of the aesthetic, later magnified by Francis Hutcheson, who expanded it to exclude personal and utilitarianism interests and associations of a more general nature from aesthetic experience. This concept was further developed by Archibald Alison who referred it to a particular state of mind.

== Theories ==
The theory of disinterestedness opened doors for a better understanding of the aesthetics dimensions of nature in terms of three conceptualizations:

1. The idea of beautiful: this applied to tamed and cultivated European gardens and landscapes
2. The idea of the sublime: this explained the threatening and terrifying side of nature such as mountains and wilderness; however, when it is viewed through the disinterestedness perspective, it can be aesthetically appreciated rather than feared or neglected
3. The notion of the picturesque: the term "picturesque" means "picture-like", where the natural world is experienced as if it is divided into art-like scenes

Objects experienced as beautiful tend to be small, smooth, and fair in color. In contrast, objects viewed as sublime tend to be powerful, intense and terrifying. Picturesque items are a mixture of both, which can be seen as varied and irregular, rich and forceful, and even vibrant.

Andrew Lothian's The Science of Scenery (2017) measures scenic beauty by having members of the public rate photographs of landscapes. In a review, Rudi van Etteger objected that the method favours the picturesque over the sublime, and argued from the work of Allen Carlson, Arnold Berleant and Yuriko Saito that static photographs leave out bodily engagement with the environment and the value of everyday places.

== 21st century developments ==
Cognitive and non-cognitive approaches of nature have directed their focus from natural environments to the consideration of human and human-influenced environments and developed aesthetic investigations of everyday life. (Carlson and Lintott, 2007; Parsons 2008a; Carlson 2010)

== Human Perspectives and Relationship with Nature ==
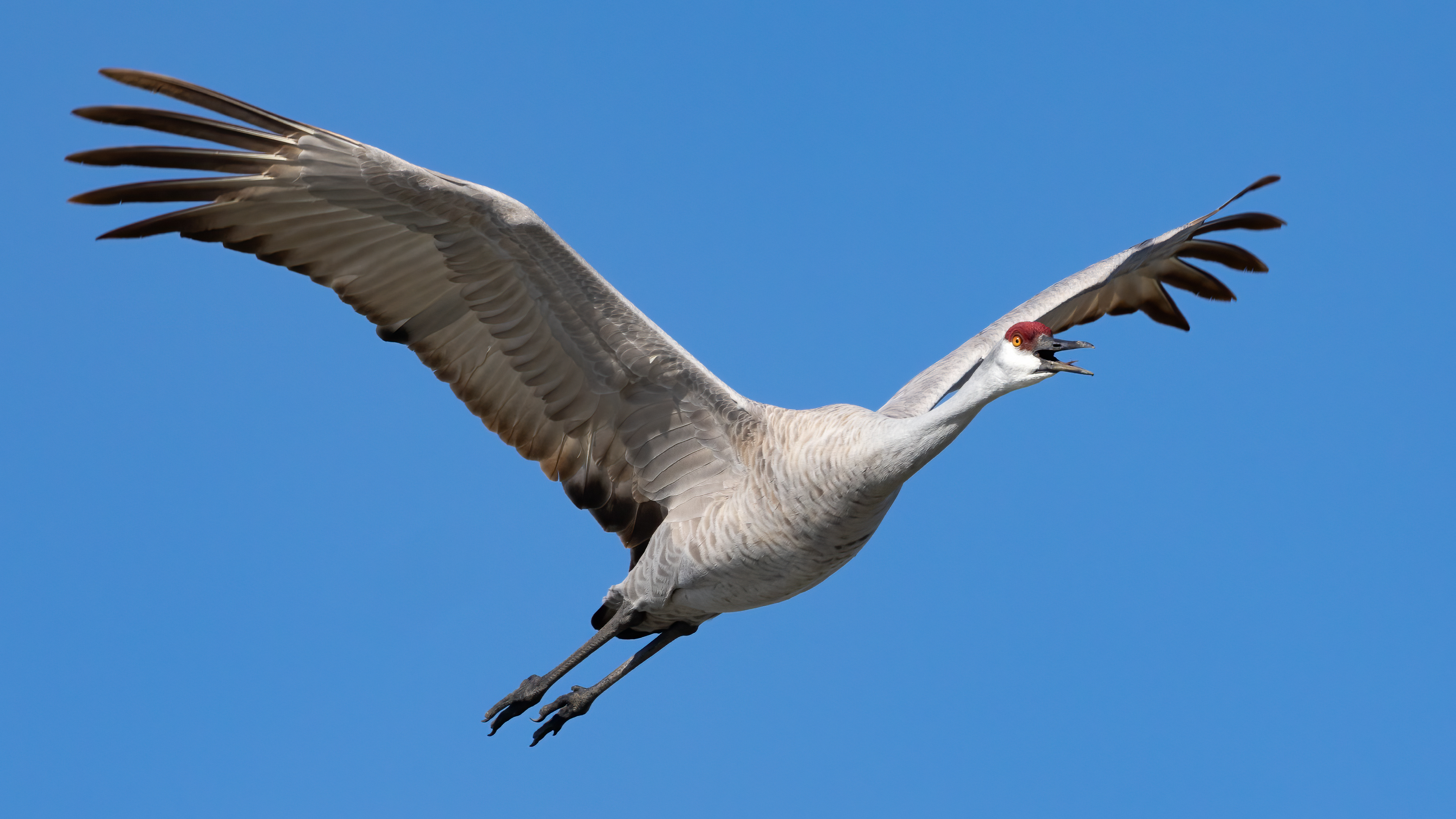
A sandhill crane in flight

People may be mistaken by the art object analogy. For instance, a sandhill crane is not an art object; an art object is not a sandhill crane. In fact, an art object should be called an artifact. The crane is wildlife on its own and is not an art object. This can be related to Saito's definition of the cognitive view. In elaboration, the crane lives through various ecosystems such as Yellowstone. Nature is a living system which includes animals, plants, and Eco-systems. In contrast, an art object has no regeneration, evolutionary history, or metabolism. An individual may be in the forest and perceive it as beautiful because of the plethora of colors such as red, green, and yellow. This is a result of the chemicals interacting with chlorophyll. An individual's aesthetic experience may increase; however, none of the things mentioned have anything to do with what is really going on in the forest. The chlorophyll is capturing solar energy and the residual chemicals protect the trees from insect grazing.

Any color perceived by human visitors for a few hours is entirely different from what is really happening. According to Leopold, the three features of ecosystems that generate land ethic are integrity, stability and beauty. None of the mentioned features are real in nature. Ecosystems are not stable: they are dramatically changing and they have little integration; ergo, beauty is in the eye of the beholder.

== Integrating the aesthetics of nature into the Euclidean man-made space ==
Euclidean human-made space can be altered by integrating the aesthetics of nature. Fractal patterns offer the chance to enhance man-made spaces by introducing visually soothing natural designs. Research indicates a preference for specific fractal complexities that resemble nature's patterns. Three experiments explored various fractal designs, revealing that viewers' perceptions of pattern complexity and engagement increase with the fractal's complexity. These perceptions remained consistent across different designs, methodologies, and cultural backgrounds.

== Objectives ==
In a Post-Modern approach, when an individual engages in aesthetically appreciating a natural thing, we give meaning to the thing we appreciate and in that meaning, we express and develop our own attitudes, values and beliefs. Our interest in natural things are not only a passive reflection of our inclinations, as Croce describes as the appreciation of nature as looking in a mirror, or what we might call our inward life; but may instead be the things we come across in nature that engage and stimulate our imagination. As a result, we are challenged to think differently and apply thoughts and associations to in new situations and ways.

As a characterization of the appreciation of art, nature aestheticists argue that post modernism is a mistaken view because we do not have a case of anything goes. The aesthetics appreciation of art is governed by some normative standards. In the world of art, criticism may take place when people come together and discuss books and films or critics write appraisals for publications. On the contrary, there are not obvious instances of debate and appraisals where different judgments about the aesthetics of character of nature are evaluated.

== See also ==
- Ecosemiotics
- Environmental philosophy
