= Katya Mandoki =

Mexican writer

Katya Mandoki is a scholar of philosophy, author and experimental artist.

== Career ==
Mandoki pioneered the systematic research of Everyday Aesthetics coining the term "Prosaics" (1994) for this subfield of Aesthetics. In her book Everyday Aesthetics, the first extended treatment of this subject, she opens up the study of aesthetics – traditionally confined to art and beauty – to encompass all those aspects involving sensibility in common experience using the human body as a starting point for this analysis. Her work covers not only the positive aspect of aesthetics but also its negative side such as cruelty and abuse upon someone's sensibility, never before thought of in those terms. She stresses the danger of political manipulation of sensibility illustrated by the propagandistic use of aesthetics specifically during the Nazi regime. From Mandoki's work on the negativity of aesthetics Arnold Berleant takes off to analyze this issue in relation to terrorism. The subfield of everyday aesthetics is so fertile that it has been followed and enriched by a number of contemporary aestheticians.

Mandoki has published eight books on this topic, the most recent presenting and developing the concept of bio-aesthetics that traces sensibility not only in humans but in the most elemental creatures from an evolutionary perspective. She is a member of the Mexican Academy of Sciences, of the National System of Researchers (SNI), and founder and honorary member of the Mexican Association of Aesthetics (AMEST) serving as president from 2007 to 2011. She has been professor of aesthetics and semiotics at Metropolitan Autonomous University (UAM) in Mexico where she established and chaired postgraduate specialization studies in Aesthetics, Semiotics and Theory of Culture, has taught postgraduate level at National Autonomous University of Mexico (UNAM) and given courses for Instituto Nacional de Bellas Artes and Universidad Iberoamericana. She received the National Prize for Arts in experimental work (1982, 1985) by the INBA, the Prize for Academic Research by UAM (1995, 2007, 2015) and participated in various individual and collective artwork exhibitions at museums and galleries such as Palacio de Bellas Artes on several occasions. Her monumental sculpture Histogram on the distribution of income in Mexico can be visited at the Library Plaza in the Xochimilco Campus of UAM. Mandoki published more than 150 articles on aesthetics and semiotics and presented papers and lectures in 20 countries. Presently, Mandoki works on the International Association of Aesthetics' executive committee (IAA), at the international advisory board of the International Institute of Applied Aesthetics, Finland, and on the international editorial board of various academic journals such as Contemporary Aesthetics, Cultural Politics and Environment, Land, Society, Architectonics.

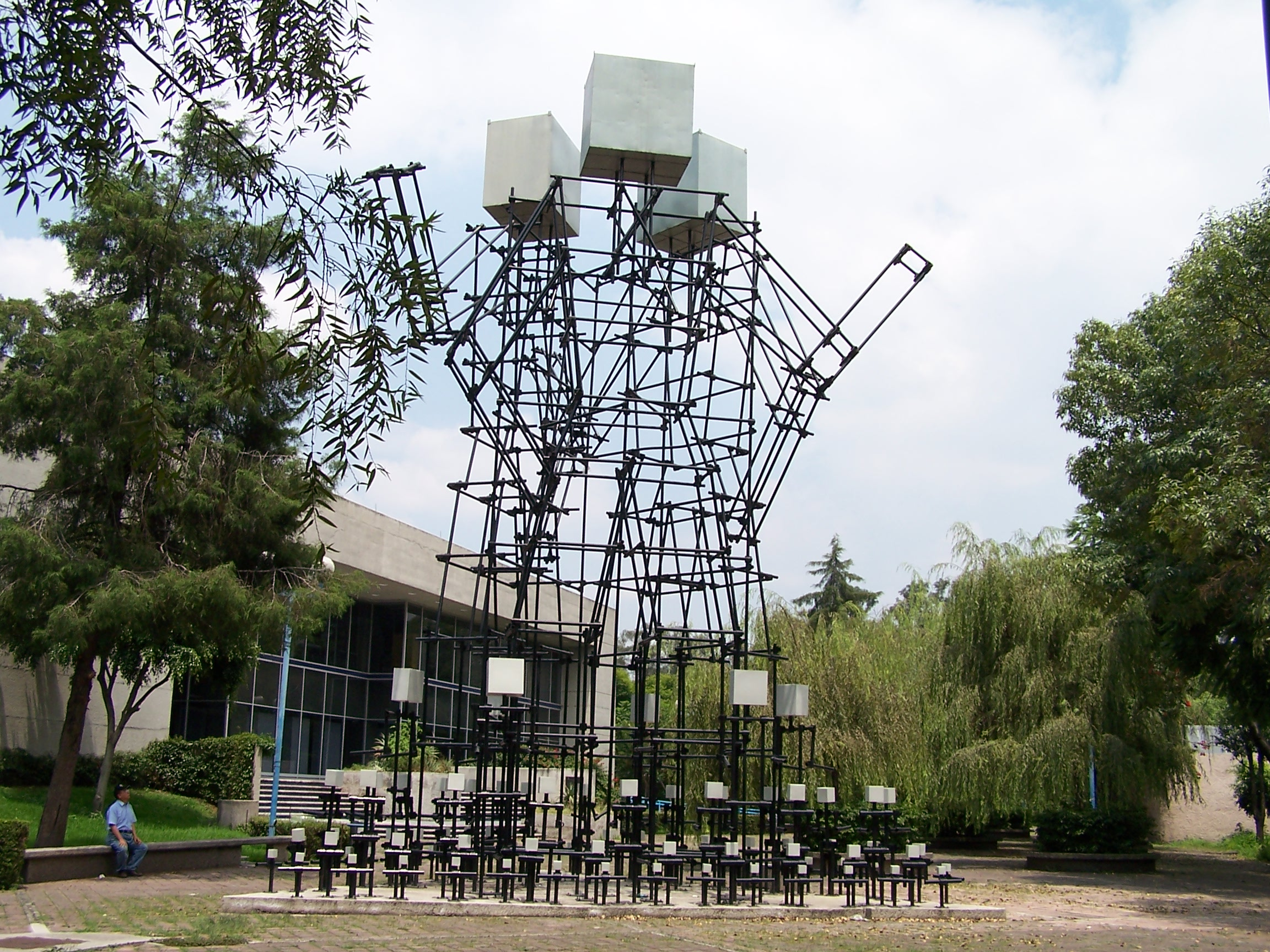
Monumental sculpture by Katya Mandoki at Universidad Autónoma Metropolitana about the distribution of income in Mexico.

== Books ==
- The Indispensable Excess of the Aesthetic: Evolution of Sensibility in Nature. ( Lexington Books, Rowman & Littlefield 2015) ISBN 1498503063.
- El indispensable exceso de la estética. (México: Siglo XXI editores, 2013) ISBN 978-607-03-0470-5.
- Everyday aesthetics: prosaics, the play of culture, and social identities. (Aldershot: Ashgate, 2007) ISBN 978-0-7546-5889-4.
- La construcción estética del Estado y de la identidad nacional: Prosaica III. (México: Siglo XXI editores, 2007) ISBN 978-968-23-2677-6.
- Prácticas estéticas e identidades sociales: Prosaica II. (México: Siglo XXI editores, 2007) ISBN 978-968-23-2654-7.
- Estética cotidiana y juegos de la cultura: Prosaica I. (México: Siglo XXI editores, 2006) ISBN 978-968-23-2653-0.
- Estética y comunicación: de acción, pasión y seducción. (Bogotá: Grupo Editorial Norma 2006) ISBN 978-958-04-9637-3.
- Prosaica; introducción a la estética de lo cotidiano. (México: Grijalbo, 1994) ISBN 978-970-05-0514-5.
