= Claus-Christian Carbon =

German psychologist (born 1971)

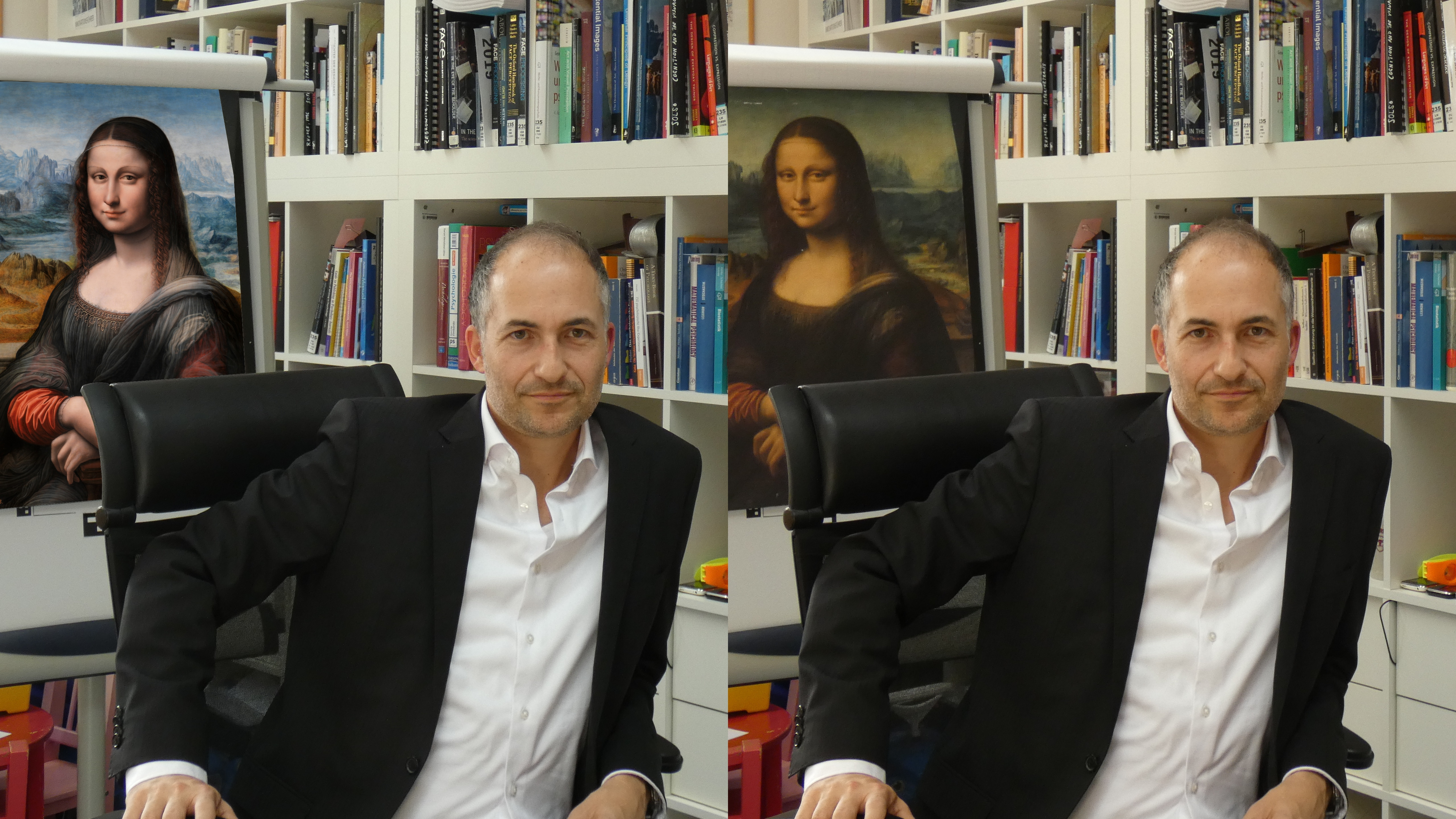
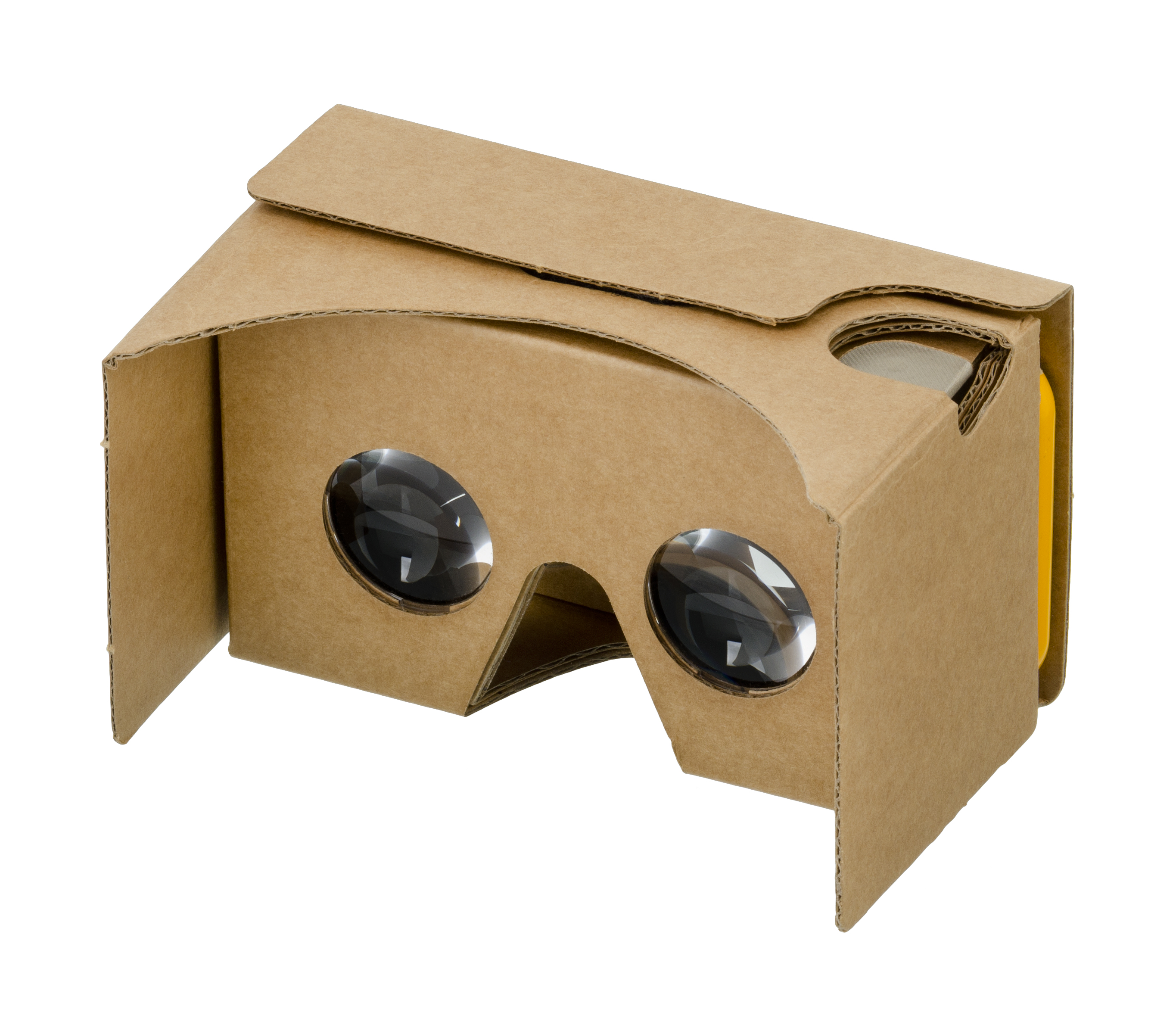
- Claus-Christian Carbon in Bamberg in front of Mona Lisa
- Born: 23 March 1971 (age 55); West Germany
- Other name: CCC
- Education: University of Trier (Diplom (psychology) & Magister (philosophy); Freie Universität Berlin (Dr. phil. (psychology); University of Vienna (Habilitation (psychology)
- Known for: Mona Lisa as a stereogram
- Scientific career
- Fields: Psychology; Aesthetics; Face perception
- Workplaces: University of Bamberg
- Thesis: Face Processing: early processing in the recognition of faces. (Doctoral thesis; English) (2003)

Claus-Christian Carbon (born 23 March 1971 in Schweinfurt, West Germany) is a professor of psychology at the Department of General Psychology and Methodology, Institute of Psychology of the University of Bamberg, Germany. He is head of the Department of General Psychology and Methodology and head of EPÆG, an international research group. In 2021 he became dean of the Faculty of Human Sciences and Education.

== Career ==
He received his diplom degree in psychology in 1998 from the University of Trier, his magister degree in philosophy in 1999 from the University of Trier, his PhD in psychology in 2003 from Freie Universität Berlin and his habilitation in psychology in 2006 from University of Vienna. His research is mainly focused on empirical aesthetics, face processing, consumer research, haptic processing, cognitive maps, scientometrics, and conspiracy theories.

== Further activities ==
Carbon is editor-in-chief of the scientific journal Art & Perception and section editor of Perception and iPerception, a Consulting Editor of Musicae Scientiae, and an Action Editor of Frontiers in Perception and of Frontiers in Neuroscience. He is on the editorial board of the journal Advances in Cognitive Psychology.

== Selected publications ==
- Carbon, C. C., & Jakesch, M. (2013). A model for haptic aesthetic processing and its implications for design. Proceedings of the IEEE, 101(9), 1–11. {IF=6.810}
- Carbon, C. C., & Ditye, T. (2011). Sustained effects of adaptation on the perception of familiar faces. Journal of Experimental Psychology: Human Perception & Performance, 37(3), 615–625. {IF=2.947}
- Carbon, C. C. (2010). The cycle of preference: Long‐term dynamics of aesthetic appreciation. Acta Psychologica, 134(2), 233‐244. {IF=2.155}
- Carbon, C.C. (2010). The Earth is flat when personally significant experiences with the sphericity of the Earth are absent. Cognition, 116(1), 130–135. {IF=3.481}
- Grüter, T., & Carbon, C. C. (2010). Escaping attention. Some cognitive disorders can be overlooked. Science, 328(5977), 435‐436. {IF=28.103}
