= Environmental good =

Non-market public goods

Yosemite National Park, an example of an environmental good.

Environmental goods are typically non-market goods, including clean air, clean water, landscape, green transport infrastructure (footpaths, cycleways, greenways, etc.), public parks, urban parks, rivers, mountains, forests, and beaches. Environmental goods are a sub-category of public goods. Concerns with environmental goods focus on the effects that the exploitation of ecological systems have on the economy, the well-being of humans and other species, and on the environment. Users not having to pay an upfront cost and external factors like pollution that can damage environmental goods indefinitely are some of the challenges in protecting environmental goods.

== Valuation ==
There have been many efforts to place an economic value on environmental goods, but no consensus yet exists on the method of valuation. The challenges in the way of obtaining these economic values include the free-rider problem, difficulties in assigning ownership, and the non-divisibility of environmental goods.

=== Methods ===
Assigning a willingness to pay to environmental goods is one method that economists use to try to assess their value. Small scale simulated markets have been used in conjunction with contingent valuation methods in order to assess the relative values of economic goods, as well as an attempt to assign them dollar values. Other studies criticize these methods for expecting an unrealistic amount of mental effort on the part of the subjects who are asked to assign values, as well as for introducing framing effects and inherent biases relating to subjects' perceptions of dollar values.

=== Measures of economic progress ===
Alternative measures of economic progress, including the Genuine Progress Indicator, Gross National Happiness, and Gross National Well-being factor living environmental wellness, ecological vitality, and the effects of resource depletion and long-term environmental damage into their models. These metrics aim to categorize not only the economical and monetary values of environmental goods and services, but also their effects on the emotional and psychological well-being of individuals within a society.

== Trade definition ==
In trade documents released by the United States, "environmental good" primarily refers to goods that are used for preserving the environment, such as renewable energy technologies and pollution management systems. In 2015, the U.S. exported $238 billion of environmental goods, while trading among nations globally of environmental goods totaled around $1 trillion. The United States and the World Trade Organization (WTO) and aims to lower tariffs on environmental goods in hopes of increasing the United States' access to more sustainable technology.

=== Environmental Goods Agreement ===
Since 2015, delegates from 18 members of the WTO, including the European Union and its member states, have been negotiating the Environmental Goods Agreement in hopes of cutting tariffs on many environmental goods. Australia chairs the negotiations.

The negotiations aimed to increase the transfer of technologies which are cleaner for the environment and more cost competitive, including technologies in the realm of air pollution control, waste treatment, renewable energy, and environmental monitoring, and energy efficiency. The WTO hopes to provide higher-quality environmental goods at cheaper costs and to help developing countries to expedite the process of obtaining cleaner technologies. The agreement would also aim to lower costs of environmental protection, and to provide "green" jobs to people around the world.

Talks collapsed in 2016, although the Australian government notes that "a range of interested Members continue to examine issues and consider options for an eventual return to negotiations".

== See also ==
- Landscape planning
- Natural environment
- Ecological goods and services
- Natural capital
- Natural resource
- Public goods
- Sustainable landscape architecture
- Town planning
