= Yuriko Saito =

Japanese-American philosopher

- 斉藤 百合子
- Born: 1953 (age 72–73); Japan
- Occupation: Philosopher

Education
- Education: International Christian U. (BA); U. of Wisconsin–Madison (PhD)
- Thesis: The Aesthetic Appreciation of Nature: Western and Japanese Perspectives and Their Ethical Implications (1983)
- Doctoral advisor: Donald W. Crawford

Philosophical work
- Institutions: Rhode Island School of Design
- Main interests: Aesthetics
- Website: https://www.yurikosaito.com/

Yuriko Saito (Japanese: 斉藤 百合子, born 1953) is a retired Japanese-American philosopher specializing in aesthetics, including wabi-sabi, the Japanese philosophy of appreciating transience and imperfection. She is a professor emeritus of philosophy at the Rhode Island School of Design (RISD).

== Education and career ==
Saito is originally from Sapporo, Japan, where she was born in 1953. She studied philosophy at International Christian University in Tokyo, earning a bachelor's degree there. Next, she completed her PhD in philosophy, with a minor in Japanese literature, at the University of Wisconsin–Madison. Her 1983 doctoral dissertation, The Aesthetic Appreciation of Nature: Western and Japanese Perspectives and Their Ethical Implications, was supervised by Donald W. Crawford.

Meanwhile, she began working for the Rhode Island School of Design as an assistant professor in 1981. She remained there for the rest of her career, becoming a full professor in 1995 and retiring as professor emeritus in 2018.

== Recognition ==
Saito's book Aesthetics of the Familiar: Everyday Life and Worldmaking was the 2018 winner of the Outstanding Monograph Prize of the American Society for Aesthetics.

In 2020, Saito was the Richard Wollheim Lecturer at the British Society of Aesthetics Annual Conference.

== Selected publications ==
=== Books ===
- Everyday Aesthetics. Oxford: Oxford University Press, 2007. Paperback, 2010.
- Aesthetics of the Familiar: Everyday Life and World-Making. Oxford: Oxford University Press, 2017. Paperback, 2019.
- Aesthetics of Care: Practice in Everyday Life. London: Bloomsbury Publishing, 2022.

=== Articles ===
- "The Japanese Aesthetics of Imperfection and Insufficiency", The Journal of Aesthetics and Art Criticism, Vol. 55, 1997, pp. 377–385, doi:10.2307/430925, JSTOR 430925
- "Appreciating Nature on Its Own Terms", Environmental Ethics, Vol. 20, 1998, pp. 135–149, doi:10.5840/enviroethics199820228
- "The Significance of Environmental Aesthetics", in: Valery Vino (ed.), Introduction to Philosophy: Aesthetic Theory and Practice. Montreal, Quebec: The Rebus Community, 2021, pp. 106–108.
- "Living with Everyday Objects: Aesthetic and Ethical Practice", in: Eva Kit Wah Man; Jeffrey Petts (eds.), Comparative Everyday Aesthetics: East-West Studies in Contemporary Living. Amsterdam: Amsterdam University Press, 2023, pp. 9–20, doi:10.1515/9789048554508-001, JSTOR j.ctv37363s6
