= European Landscape Convention =

Multilateral environmental agreement

European Landscape Convention of the Council of Europe
- Signed: 20 October 2000
- Location: Strasbourg, France
- Effective: 1 March 2004
- Parties: 41
- Depositary: Treaty Office of the Council of Europe
- Languages: English and French

The European Landscape Convention of the Council of Europe, also known as the Florence Convention, is the first international treaty to be exclusively devoted to all aspects of European landscape. It applies to the entire territory of the Parties and covers natural, rural, urban and peri-urban areas. It concerns landscapes that might be considered outstanding as well as everyday or degraded landscapes. The convention is aimed at: the protection, management and planning of all landscapes and raising awareness of the value of a living landscape.

== History ==
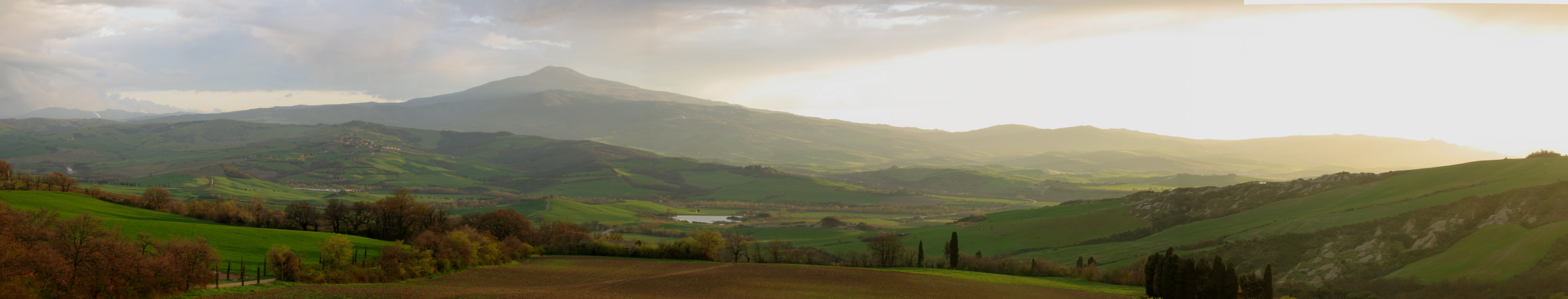
Val d'Orcia

=== Background ===
The work on the convention was initiated by the Congress of Regional and Local Authorities of the Council of Europe (CLRAE) in 1994. Within the CLRAE, the draft convention was prepared by a Working Group chaired by different CLRAE members (Cristiana Storelli, Pierre Hitier and François Paour) and co-ordinated by Riccardo Priore, Council of Europe's official. The group included the following experts: Régis Ambroise, Michael Dower, Bengt Johansson, Yves Luginbuhl, Michel Prieur and Florencio Zoido-Naranjo. The draft Convention was consulted between ministerial representatives, international and non-governmental organisations during the CLRAE consultation conference held in Florence from 2 to 4 April 1998, after which the final draft was prepared.

=== Signing ===
The European Landscape Convention of the Council of Europe was adopted by the Committee of Ministers of the Council of Europe on 19 July 2000 in Strasbourg and opened for signature of the Member States of the Organisation in Florence (Italy) on 20 October 2000. It aims to promote European landscape protection, management and planning and to organise European co-operation. The Convention came into force on 1 March 2004.

=== Implementation ===
As of 25 October 2026, 42 Council of Europe member states have ratified the convention: Albania, Andorra, Armenia, Azerbaijan, Belgium, Bosnia and Herzegovina, Bulgaria, Croatia, Cyprus, Czech Republic, Denmark, Estonia, Finland, France, Georgia, Greece, Hungary, Iceland, Ireland, Italy, Latvia, Lithuania, Luxembourg, Malta, Moldova, Montenegro, Netherlands, North Macedonia, Norway, Poland, Portugal, Romania, San Marino, Serbia, Slovak Republic, Slovenia, Spain, Sweden, Switzerland, Turkey, Ukraine, United Kingdom.

== Purpose ==
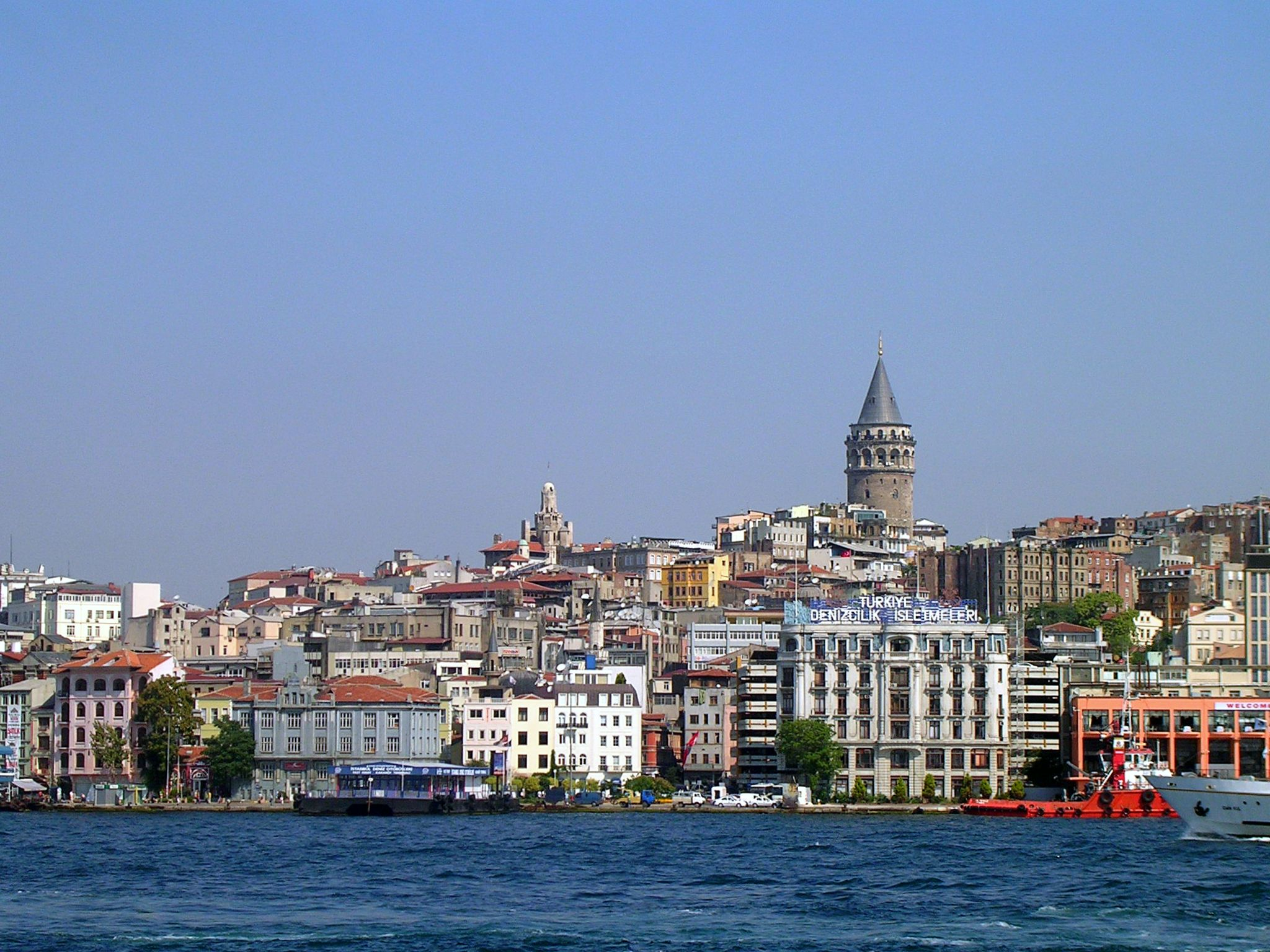
Galata

The Convention provides an important contribution to the implementation of the Council of Europe’s objectives, namely to promote democracy, human rights and the rule of law and to seek common solutions to the main problems facing European society today. By developing a new territorial culture, the Council of Europe seeks to promote populations’ quality of life and well-being.

The European Landscape Convention introduced a Europe-wide concept centring on the quality of landscape protection, management and planning and covering the entire territory, not just outstanding landscapes. Through its ground-breaking approach and its broader scope, it complements the Council of Europe’s and UNESCO’s heritage conventions.

After the 6th Conference of Parties held in Strasbourg in 3–4 May 2011, the current president of conference is selected as Portugal and vice-chair as Turkey.

== Structure ==
(The following is a summary of the full text, which is available from the Council of Europe)

The convention consists of the preamble and eighteen articles divided into four chapters.

- Chapter I - General provisions - Art. 1 - 3;
- Chapter II - National measures - Art. 4 - 6;
- Chapter III - European co-operation - Art. 7 - 11;
- Chapter IV - Final clauses - Art. 12 - 18.

=== Preamble ===
The preamble to the convention states, inter alia, that the landscape:

- is a key element of individual and social well-being;
- contributes to the formation of local cultures and that it is a basic component of the European natural and cultural heritage;
- is an important part of the quality of life for people everywhere.

Moreover, it states that the convention is a response to the public’s wish to enjoy high quality landscapes and to play an active part in their development.

=== Articles ===
Article 1 provides a definition of 'landscape'. For the purposes of the convention it is an area whose character is the result of the action and interaction of natural and/or human factors. It also defines 'landscape protection' as actions to conserve and maintain the significant or characteristic features of a landscape and 'Landscape management' as an action ensuring the regular upkeep of a landscape, so as to guide and harmonise changes within. Finally "landscape planning" is defined as a strong forward-looking action to enhance, restore or create landscapes.

Article 2 denotes the territorial and functional scope of the treaty. It covers:

- natural, rural, urban and peri-urban areas;
- land, inland water and marine areas
- landscapes that might be considered outstanding as well as everyday or degraded landscapes.

It also states, with the exception of Art. 15 that convention applies to the entire territory of the Parties.

Article 3 provides that the aims of the treaty are to promote landscape protection, management and planning, and to organise European co-operation on landscape issues.

Article 5 and 6 state the general and specific obligations of the Parties, such as:

- establishing and implementing landscape policies aimed at landscape protection, management and planning
- integrating landscape into their regional, town planning, cultural, environmental, agricultural, social and economic policies.
- increasing awareness of the value of landscapes, their role and changes to them
- promoting training and education in landscape policy, protection, management and planning
- identifying and assessing the landscapes in their territories.

Articles 7 – 9 concern the international co-operation, assistance, exchange of the specialists and information, and encourage Parties to prepare and implement joint landscape programmes.

Article 11 denotes the Landscape Award of the Council of Europe (see below).

Article 15 allows Parties to specify the territory to which they want the convention to apply. This article has been used by e.g. by Denmark to exclude the treaty's application to Greenland.

Article 16 gives any Party permission to denounce the convention, at any time, by a notification addressed to the Secretary General of the Council of Europe.

== Relation to other treaties ==
The European Landscape Convention of the Council of Europe is an international-level legal text that addresses the protection and management of natural and cultural heritage, and regional and spatial planning. It is complementary to other international treaties, such as:

- the UNESCO Convention concerning the Protection of the World Cultural and Natural Heritage, (Paris, 16 November 1972);
- the Council of Europe Convention on the Conservation of European Wildlife and Natural Habitats, (Bern, 19 September 1979);
- the Council of Europe Convention for the Protection of the Architectural Heritage of Europe, (Granada, 3 October 1985);
- the Council of Europe Convention for the Protection of the Archaeological Heritage (revised) (Valletta, 16 January 1992).

The definition of 'landscape' in the European Landscape Convention is wider than that of 'cultural landscape' in the UNESCO World Heritage Convention; the former includes any kind of landscape while the latter denotes sites of outstanding universal value that have been identified as World Heritage Sites.

== Landscape Award of the Council of Europe ==
Article 11 of the convention establishes the Landscape award of the Council of Europe. Its purpose is to promote and serve as an example the policies and measures of local and regional authorities or NGOs, which were adopted to protect, manage and/or plan their landscape, and have proven to be effective. Until now the award was given:

- in 2009 to Lille Métropole (France), for the project "Parc de la Deûle";
- in 2011 to The Joint Committee of the Municipality of Carbonia (Italy) for "The Carbonia project : the landscape machine".
- in 2013 to the Lower Silesian Association of Landscape Parks, Poland, for preserving ecological value in the landscape of the Szprotawa river valley.
- in 2015 to the Local government authorities, the Greenways Methodological Association and the Iron Curtain Trail Association, Hungary, and all the Slovenian villages of the Hetés Region (project presented by Hungary) for the "Borderless co-operation of local communities for the landscape heritage of ‘Fabulous’ Hetés".

== See also ==
- Landscape planning
- Landscape-scale conservation
