= Arnold Berleant =

American scholar and author

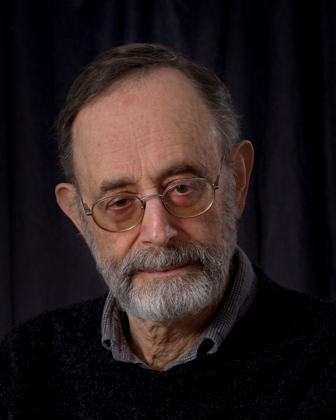
- Born: Arnold Berleant; March 4, 1932 (age 94); Buffalo, New York
- Education: Eastman School of Music (B.M.); Eastman School of Music (M.A.); State University of New York (Ph.D.)
- Known for: Scholar, author

Arnold Berleant (born March 4, 1932) is an American scholar and author who is active in both philosophy and music.

== Education ==
Berleant was born in Buffalo, New York. He attended State University of New York College at Fredonia from 1949 to 1951, where he studied music education with piano as his principal instrument. He then enrolled at the Eastman School of Music of the University of Rochester, earning a Bachelor of Music with distinction in 1953 and a Master of Arts in 1955, both in music theory, while continuing piano as his major instrument. His master's thesis was titled The Fugue in the Orchestral Works of Bartók. He later pursued graduate studies in philosophy at the State University of New York at Buffalo, where he received a Ph.D. in 1962. His doctoral dissertation was titled Logic and Social Doctrine: Dewey's Methodological Approach to Social Philosophy.

== Career ==
Berleant is Professor of Philosophy (Emeritus) at Long Island University, former secretary-general and past president of the International Association of Aesthetics, and former secretary-treasurer of the American Society for Aesthetics.

Berleant is the founding editor of Contemporary Aesthetics, an international on-line journal of contemporary aesthetic theory, research, and application. His body of work has been digitized and is part of the Archival & Manuscript Collection in the University at Buffalo Library.

As a philosopher Berleant has written on aspects of both aesthetic theory and the arts. These include ontological and metaphysical issues, basic theoretical questions such as appreciation and aesthetic experience, and explorations of music, architecture, painting and literature. His first book, The Aesthetic Field: A Phenomenology of Aesthetic Experience (1970), established the concept of the aesthetic field as a contextual framework within which questions in aesthetics and the arts can be most fully illuminated. In Art and Engagement (1991), Berleant exemplified the usefulness of the concept of the aesthetic field by applying it to a range of arts – landscape painting, architecture and environmental design, literature, music, dance, and film.

The innovative concept of aesthetic engagement leads to new perspectives on a variety of traditional esthetic topics, including metaphorical language, urban design, music, and metaphysics, and opens less traditional topics, such as virtual reality and social interaction to aesthetic analysis.

== Honors and awards ==
- Poiesis Prize, inaugural award and lecture, International Urban Design Congress, "Beauty and the Built Landscape," Viterbo, Italy. June 21, 2025.
- Liber Amicorum for Arnold Berleant in Popular Inquiry, Vol. 10. 2022
- Doctor of Fine Arts (Hon.), The Rhode Island School of Design, 2011
- Honorary Guest Professor, Wuhan University, P.R. China, 2004–2007
- Honorary Life Member, International Association for Aesthetics, 2002
- Membre du Comité d'Honneur de la Société française d'esthétique, 2000
- Honorary Member, Sydney Society for Literature and Aesthetics, 1999
- Honorary Member, Finnish Society of Aesthetics, 1997
- President, International Association for Aesthetics, 1995–1998
- Long Island University Trustees Award for Scholarly Achievement, 1992 for Art and Engagement.

== Works ==
- The Social Aesthetics of Human Environments: Critical Themes (Bloomsbury, 2023).ISBN 978-1-350-34932-2.
- Aesthetics beyond the Arts: New and Recent Essays (Aldershot: Ashgate, 2012). ISBN 978-1-4094-4134-2.
- Sensibility and Sense: The Aesthetic Transformation of the Human World (Exeter: Imprint Academic, 2010). ISBN 978-1-84540-173-3.
- Re-thinking Aesthetics, Rogue Essays on Aesthetics and the Arts (Aldershot: Ashgate, 2004). ISBN 978-0-7546-5013-3. Polish trans., (Universitas, 2007); Chinese trans. (Wuhan University Press, 2010).
- Aesthetics and Environment, Theme and Variations on Art and Culture (Aldershot: Ashgate, 2005). ISBN 978-0-7546-5077-5.
- Living in the Landscape: Toward an Aesthetics of Environment (Lawrence: University Press of Kansas, 1997). ISBN 978-0-7006-0811-9.
- The Aesthetics of Environment (Philadelphia: Temple University Press, 1992. Paperback edition, 1994). ISBN 978-1-56639-334-8. Greek trans., (Athens: Michelis Institute, 2004). Chinese trans. (Hunan Publishing Group, 2006).
- Art and Engagement (Philadelphia: Temple University Press, 1991. Paperback edition, 1991.) ISBN 978-1-56639-084-2. Chinese trans.,(Beijing: The Commercial Press, 2011.)
- The Aesthetic Field: A Phenomenology of Aesthetic Experience (Springfield, Ill.: C. C. Thomas 1970). 2nd edition (Cybereditions 2001). ISBN 978-1-877275-25-8
- The Fugue in the Orchestral Works of Bartók (Rochester: University of Rochester Press, 1958). Microcards.

=== Editor ===
- Perspectives on Contemporary Aesthetics. Co-edited with Yuriko Saito. (RISD Shortrun Publications, 2016). ISBN 978-1-94410-301-9.
- Contemporary Aesthetics, Editor-in-Chief (2003-2017).
- Environment and the Arts; Perspectives on Art and Environment. Editor. (Aldershot: Ashgate, 2002). ISBN 978-0-7546-0543-0. Chinese trans., Liu Yu, (Chongqing Publishing House, 2007).
- The Aesthetics of Human Environments. Co-edited with Allen Carlson. (Peterborough, Ont.: Broadview, 2007). ISBN 978-1-55111-685-3.
- The Aesthetics of Natural Environments. Co-edited with Allen Carlson. (Peterborough, Ont.: Broadview, 2004). ISBN 978-1-55111-470-5
- The Journal of Aesthetics and Art Criticism, 56/2 (1998). Special issue on environmental aesthetics. Guest co-editor (with Allen Carlson).
- The Ethical Factor in Business Decisions (Brookville, N.Y.: C. W. Post Center of Long Island University, 1982). Editor.

=== Journal Issues ===
- Contemporary Aesthetics, "Aesthetic Engagement and Sensibility: Reflections on Arnold Berleant's Work". Special Volume 9 (2021) edited by Bogna J. Obidzińska. English translation of special issue of Sztuka y Filozofia, Vol. 37/2010.
- Espes Journal, "Aesthetics Between Art and Society: Perspectives of Arnold Berleant's Postkantian Aesthetics of Engagement," Vol. 6, No. 2, edited by Aleksandra Lukaszewicz Alcaraz (2017).
- Sztuka i Filozofia, Vol. 37/2010, edited by Bogna J. Obidzińska.

== Notes ==
- University of Buffalo had just become a unit of the State University of New York at Buffalo when Berleant received his doctorate. It is now called The University at Buffalo.
- Contemporary Aesthetics is an international, interdisciplinary, peer- and blind-reviewed online journal of contemporary theory, research, and application in aesthetics. (ISSN 1932-8478)
- Berleant first introduced the term 'engagement' in "The Experience and Criticism of Art," Sarah Lawrence Journal, Winter 1967, pp. 55–64.
