= Landscape planning =

Branch of architecture

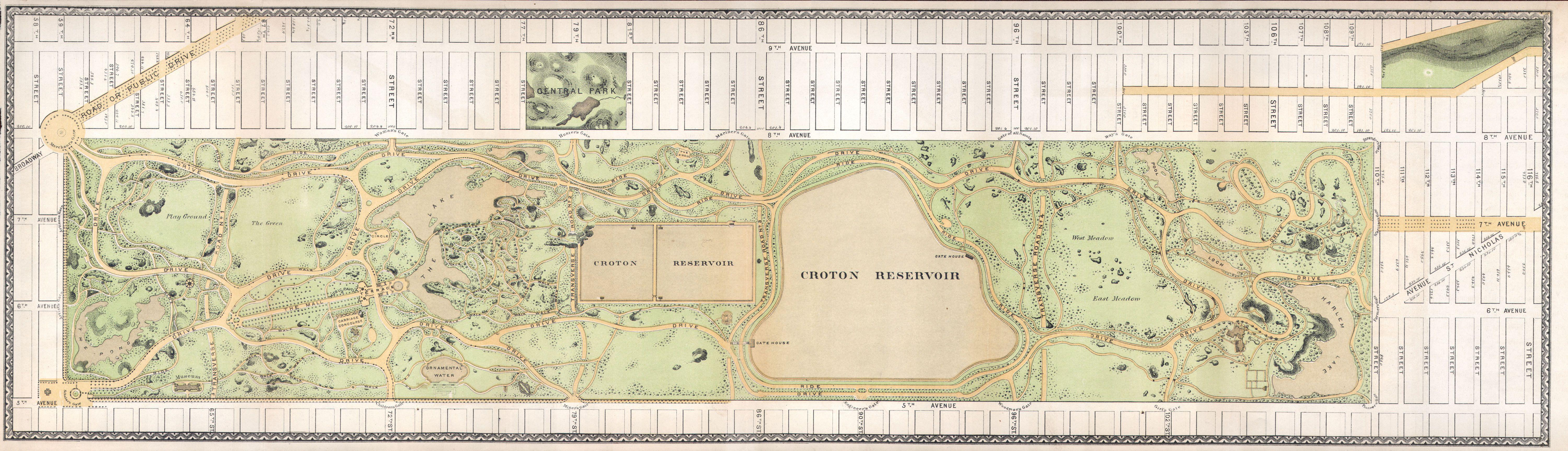
Landscape map of Central Park

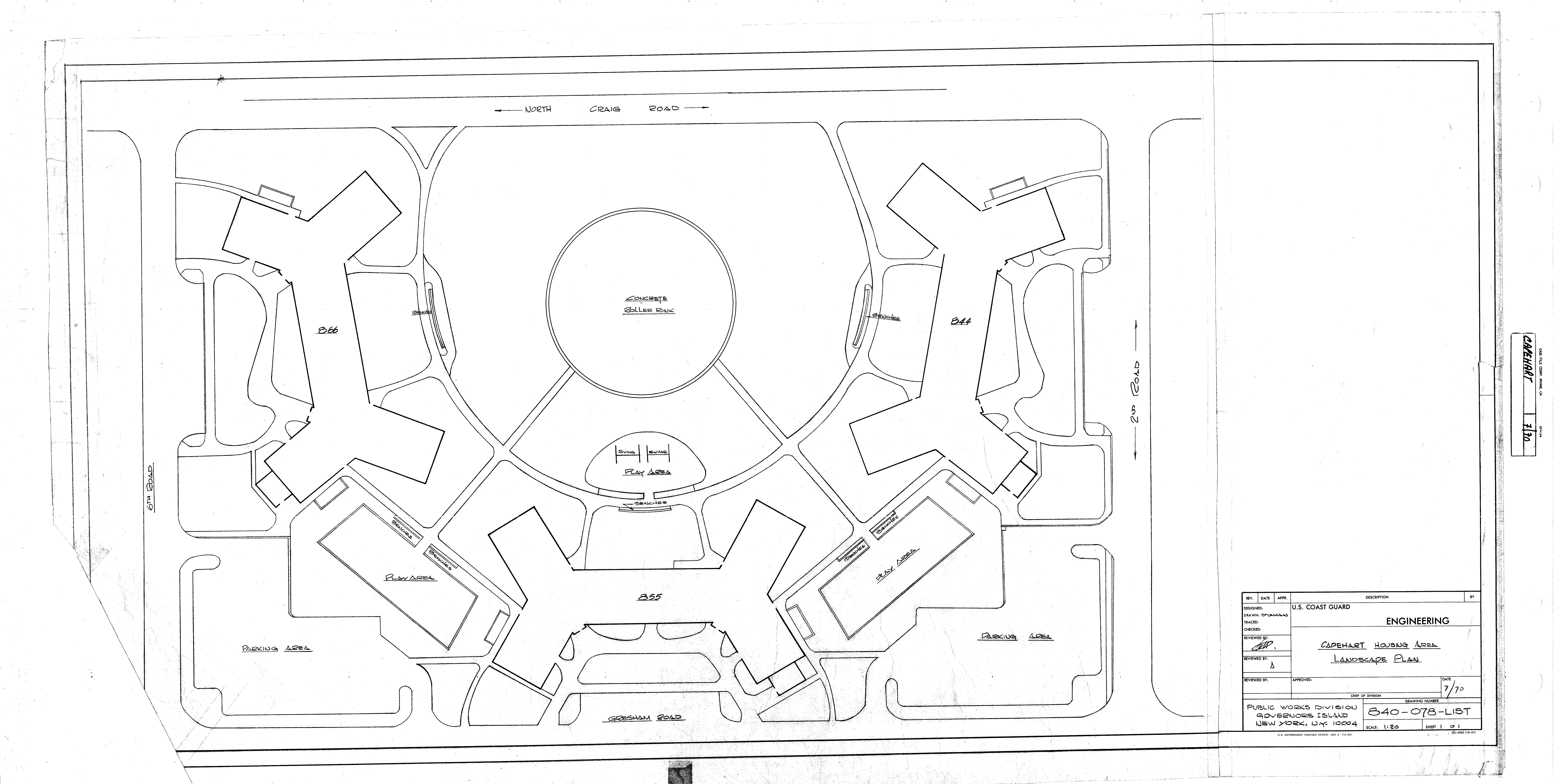
Landcape plan for a housing development.

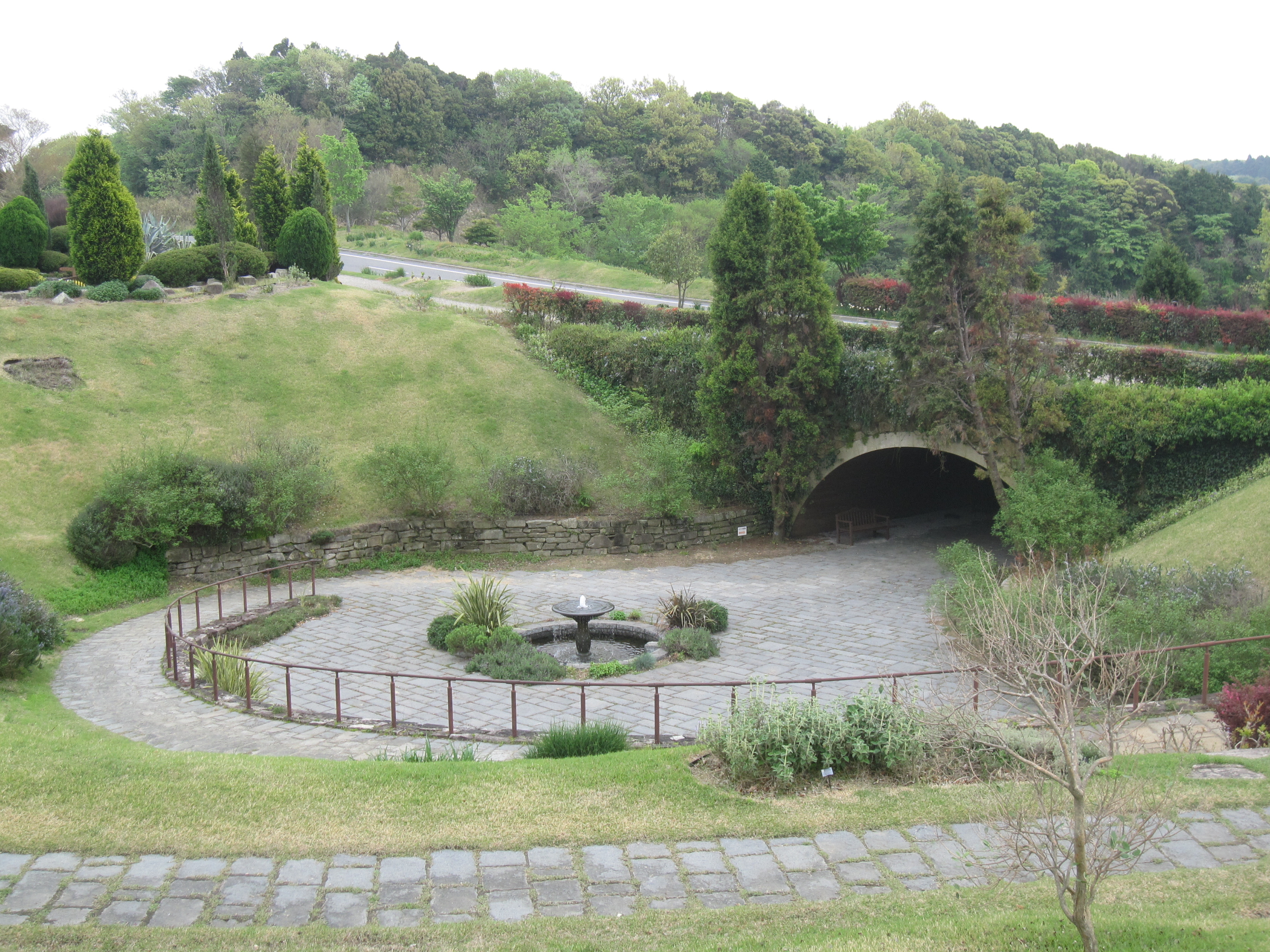
This picture shows a product of landscaping which balances ecological integrity, cultural values while dealing with pressures from the need for transportation. File:淡路景観園芸学校 Awaji Landscape Planning ^ Horticulture Academy - panoramio.jpg

Landscape planning, a branch of landscape architecture, is a multidisciplinary field that analyzes, evaluates, and guides landscape change across area and time scales. It links scientific data with land-use regulations and spatial design, along with stakeholder goals to support how landscapes should develop and evolve. because landscapes function as social-ecological systems, landscape planners try to balance ecological integrity, cultural values, and human well-being while dealing with pressure from urbanization and climate change and the amount of resources available to them.

Landscape planning typically follows a structured sequence, starting with goal development followed by landscape analysis, development and evaluation of alternatives, selecting the preferred options, implementation, and monitoring. The planning process follows long standing and established ecological planning methods which use landscape structure, function, change, and scale to diagnose current conditions and predict future scenarios and potential outcomes. Landscape planning was originally used in the context of non-urban land use, but it has evolved to be commonly used to address urban, peri-urban, and rural environments and treat them as interconnected systems instead of independent environments. The field has evolved because scientists now understand that most landscapes exist as urbanized social–ecological systems which result from ecological processes and cultural practices and economic activities and institutional frameworks.

Despite the practical importance of landscape planning, it is widely described as an under-theorized field. Compared to adjacent fields such as ecology or geography, relatively few journals explicitly address landscape planning theory. Landscape and Urban Planning is one of the only major journals dedicated to landscape planning and even it emphasizes practice more than theory, which contributes to a weak conceptual framework of the whole field. Landscape planning draws from ecology, sociology, economics, engineering, and design. While the interdisciplinary nature is essential to the practical application of landscape planning, it also means that landscape planning lacks a single shared theoretical tradition. Linked fields such as landscape sociology are themselves new fields and not fully defined, adding to theoretical and conceptual confusion. Earlier generations of landscape planners relied on theories such as general systems theory, hierarchy theory, and stability models, however, these frameworks appear less frequently in contemporary literature and are essentially replaced by applicational concepts, such as green infrastructure, ecosystem services, social equity, health, cultural values, and governance, which outpaced the developing of a consolidated theory and creates gaps between practice and concept. In addition, landscape planning has highly elaborate procedural models aren't consistently grounded in a unified theory of landscape planning. Scientific concepts from landscape ecology, such as connectivity, resilience, and multi functionality, are used intensively during the landscape analysis phase and far less during goal development, decision making, and monitoring phases, showing incomplete theoretical integration across the structured sequence landscape planning typically follows.

According to Erv Zube (1931–2002) landscape planning is defined as an activity concerned with developing landscaping amongst competing land uses while protecting natural processes and significant cultural and natural resources. Park systems and greenways of the type designed by Frederick Law Olmsted are key examples of landscape planning. Landscape designers tend to work for clients who wish to commission construction work. Landscape planners analyze broad issues as well as project characteristics which constrain design projects.

Landscape planners may work on projects which are of broad geographical scope, concern many land uses or many clients or are implemented over a long period of time. As an example, the damage caused by unplanned mineral extraction was one of the early reasons for a public demand for landscape planning.

== In Europe ==
Alberti wrote on the need for town squares for markets and specific implementations to make most use of the space. In North Europe this developed into the idea that residential squares should be planned around green spaces. The first space of this type was the Place des Vosges. Residential squares were also made in Britain and their planning developed into the idea of incorporating public open space (public parks within towns). Frederick Law Olmsted gave momentum to this idea with his proposal for a park systems in Boston - the famous Emerald Necklace. Patrick Abercrombie took up this idea and incorporated it in his great 1943-4 Open Space Plan for the County of London. An example of landscape planning in use is the plans of RWE in the wake of its mining operations and how they plan to use leftover detritus and soil in their re-cultivation efforts to restore the damaged ecosystems and landscapes created by open pit mines (e.g. Garzweiler surface mine).

== In the UK ==
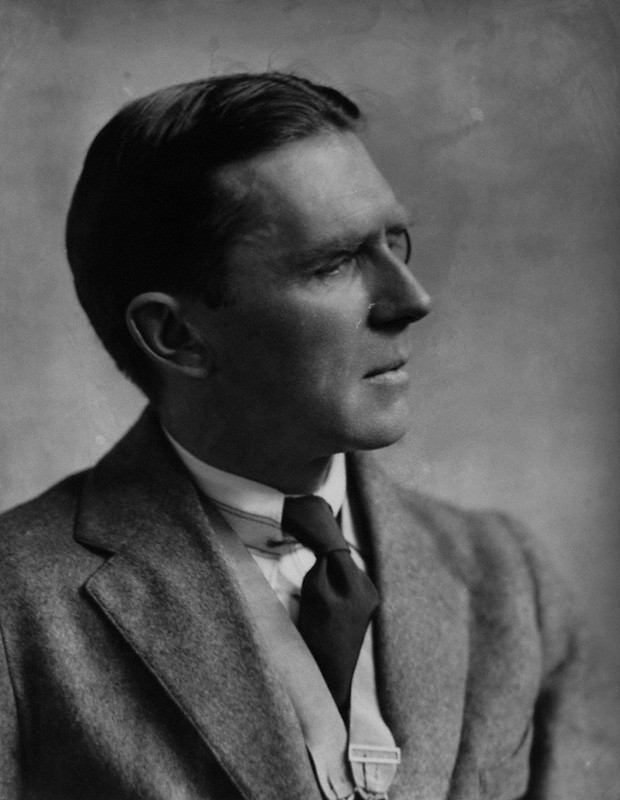
Sir (Leslie) Patrick Abercrombie FRIBA

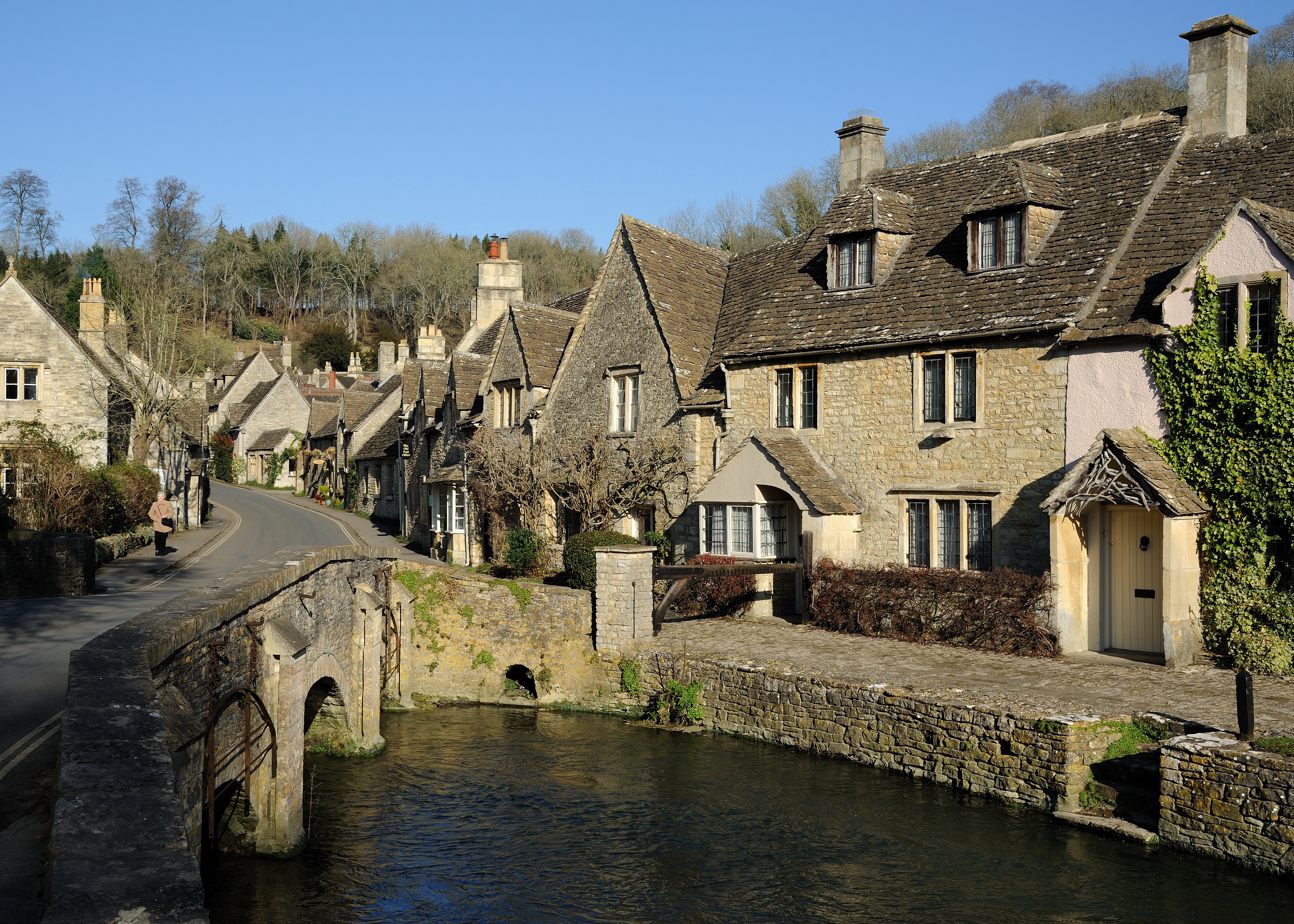
An image of the town of Castle Combe in the Cotswolds AONB

Landscape planning in the United Kingdom evolved from early preservation and public amenity movements and has become an integral element in spatial and environmental planning. Conservation interests in the scenic and cultural value of the countryside during the late nineteenth and early twentieth centuries influenced the formation of bodies such as the National Trust in 1895 and contributed to general debates on the protection of "natural beauty," "cultural heritage," and access to open space. Early twentieth century planners, such as Patrick Abercrombie, advocated for systematic landscape surveys as a basis for regional plans, linking countryside conservation to urban growth management. After World War II, national parks and Areas of Outstanding Natural Beauty (AONBs) were formally established through the National Parks and Access to the Countryside Act 1949, as a statuary framework to protect valued landscapes across England and Wales (and later Northern Ireland). These early policy and landscape protection initiatives followed objectives in heritage and social welfare, and provided public enjoyment as well as preservation. The Countryside Act 1968, and the earlier Countryside (Scotland) Act 1967, pushed this approach to also cover countryside recreation, ecological conservation, and the planning of rural areas beyond designated areas of scenic quality. From the 1960s and 70s, the rise of environmental awareness and applied ecological approach influenced the practice of landscape planning. The development of ecological design, formed by works such as Ian McHarg's Design with Nature (1969), and the emerging environment impact assessment procedures in the Environmental Assessment Regulations 1988 acts supported the inclusion of environmental science in planning processes. From the twentieth century onwards landscape character assessment (LCA) became a widely adopted method for describing, classifying, and managing landscape types across the UK. This approach presented landscapes as a product of natural processes and cultural practices, supporting the view that all landscapes have distinct characteristics that should be considered in planning and policy.

In the twenty first century, the European Landscape Convention (2000) reinforced these developments in landscape planning by treating landscape as a universal and changing phenomenon, not something specific to the countryside, extending planning responsibilities to Urban, peri-urban, and degraded areas as well as to traditionally protected countryside. UK government agencies, such as Natural England, NatureScot (formerly Scottish Natural Heritage), and the Countryside Council for Wales, integrated the principles concerning environmental awareness and the universality of landscapes into national and regional frameworks that link together landscape character, biodiversity, and cultural identity with sustainable development and community participation. Modern landscape planning in the UK operates across the country's urban and rural landscapes, trying to balance conservational and developmental objectives while contributing to nationwide agendas of regeneration, climate adaptation, and sustainable land management.

== In the US ==
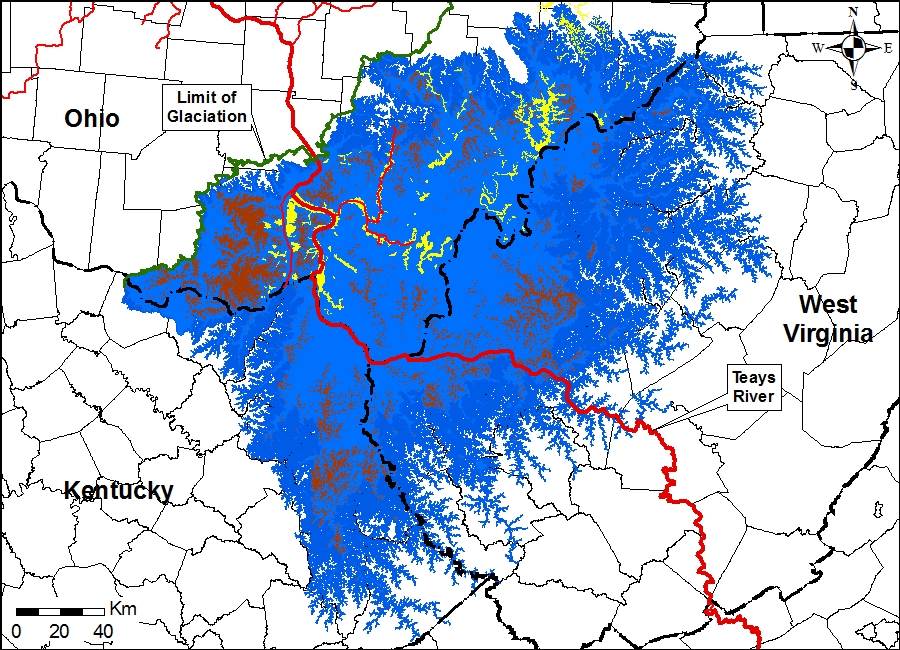
General GIS Example, focused on reconstruction

In the United States, landscape architects provide landscape planning services focused on the natural environment along with urban planners. But, unlike Canada and Europe, the US does not have a national land use planning system. Frederick Law Olmsted and Ian McHarg are two influential American landscape architects that also worked as planners. McHarg's work on overlay landscape planning contributed to the development of GIS and to the foundation of ESRI by Jack Dangermond.

== Legislation ==
The principles of landscape planning are now incorporated in various types of legislation and policy documents. In America, the National Environmental Policy Act was influenced by the work of Ian McHarg on Environmental impact assessment. In Germany, the Federal Nature Conservation Act requires the preparation of landscape plans. For the Europe Union as a whole, the European Landscape Convention has wide-ranging implications for the design and planning of relationships between development and the landscape. In Asia, major development projects are taking place and illustrating the need for good landscape planning. The Three Gorges Dam, for example, will have extensive impacts on the landscape. They have been planned to a degree but future monitoring of the project is likely to show that better landscape planning and design would have been possible. See also, National Parks and Access to the Countryside Act 1949, Countryside Act 1968, Countryside (Scotland) Act 1967, and Environmental Assessment Regulations 1988.

== Impacts and implications ==
Results of proper implementations of landscape planning practices are not only limited to more functional landscapes. It can also influence for the better many aspects of the environment and community in which it is used to its potential. While the chief purpose of landscape planning is for ecological reasons it can impact so much more when used effectively as a tool.

=== Ecology ===
Landscape planning is mainly used for ecological purposes and functions best when the result of the planning process is the least amount of interruption of ecological factors from before the implementation ever went into place. In this practice landscape planning can be used to not only maintain the status of the existing environment, but also can be used to improve aspects of previously under performing ecosystems, for example, designing to increase biodiversity. For example, Landscape planning could be used to create additional habitat for endangered species, and reclamation of previously used or depleted lands (e.g. old agricultural spaces) for expansion of natural ecosystems. This also includes planning in order to reduce the impact of the changes to the environment. with proper landscape planning, a greater speed of recovery for the ecosystems of interrupted spaces is achievable.

=== Health ===
Similar to the impacts of healing gardens, the positive healing effects of proper implementations of planned landscapes are of great benefit. When people are exposed to nature, they would find that their overall mood had improved and that they recover from stress and illness at an accelerated rate. With the proper use of landscape planning, health within an urban leaning environment in regards to stress and recovery can be greatly improved above the unplanned alternative. When landscape planning is used to properly conserve ecological systems that may have been displaced, it makes it so recreational use of the environment is maintained while conserving the systems for people to enjoy.

=== Use of other technologies in context ===
The development of GIS technology such as those developed by ESRI, have great import to the practice of Landscape planning. Use of assisting technology allows for the conditions and factors existing in a landscape to be easily aggregated and analyzed. Through the use of GIS technology you are able to answer many of the questions about a landscape that is in question. such as, "how functional is this landscape?" or "to what extent do the factors outside of the site affect the planning that needs to be done?" The use of technology that is developing with greater and greater accuracy has the ability to make sustainable developments easier and more common across the globe.

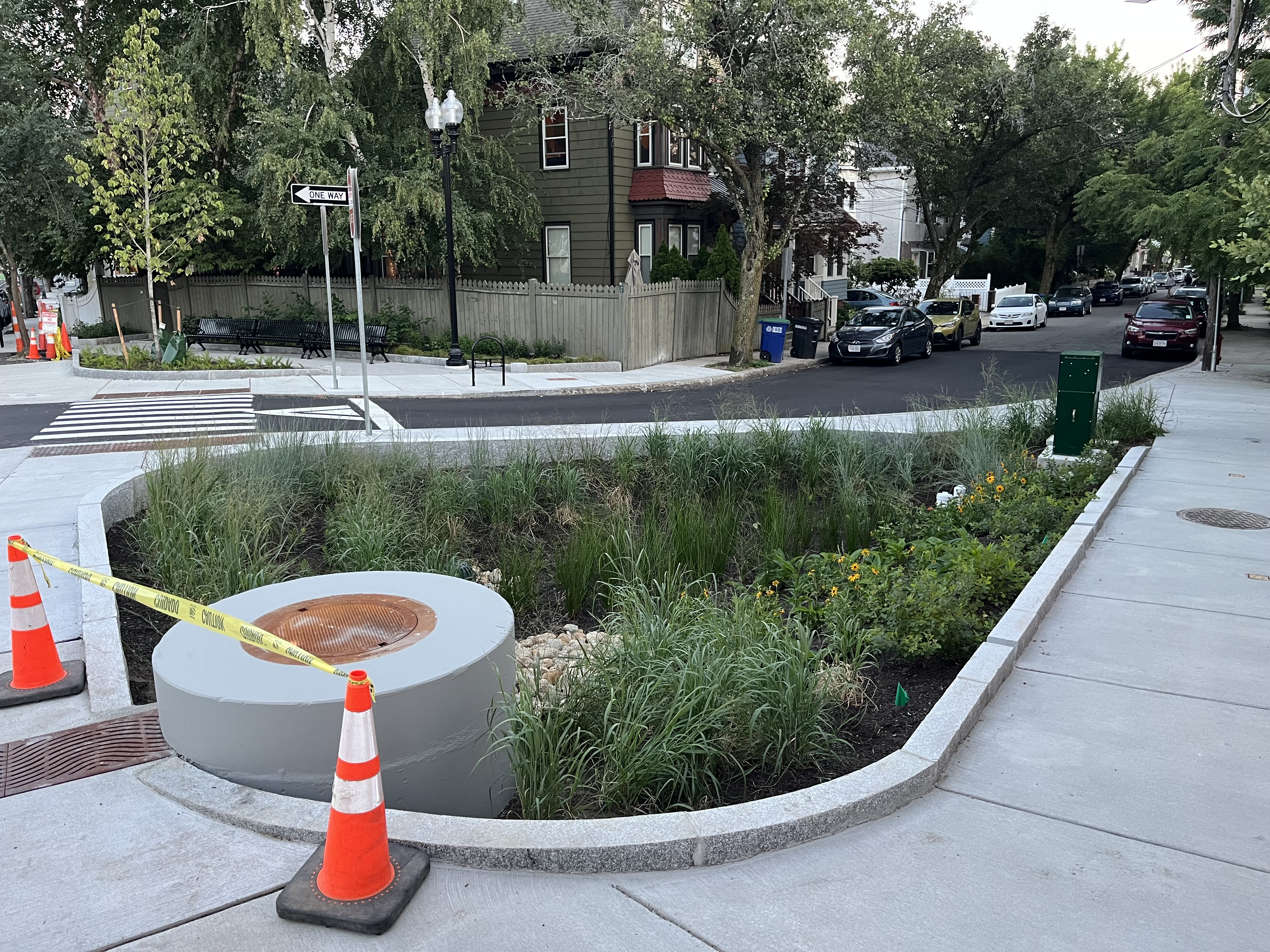
Roadside green infrastructure in Somerville, MA

== Key Themes and Concepts ==
1. Integrated Social-Ecological systems:
  - Modern landscape planning treats landscapes as couples human-natural systems and emphasizes interactions between ecological processes such as hydrology and biodiversity, human behaviors, and institutional frameworks, which aligns with broader movements with multi disciplinary and sustainable science.
2. Landscape analysis:
  - using analytic tools to analyze landscape structure, function, scale, and changes over different time frames, and using these concepts to guide assessments of land cover patterns, ecological flows, risks, and suitability, which form the scientific foundation for planning alternatives.
3. Ecosystem and landscape services:
  - Evaluates the benefits landscapes provide such as recreation, climate regulation, or cultural meaning, have become central to landscape planning.
4. Green Infrastructure:
  - the prominence of green infrastructure in landscape planning reflects the viewpoint that urban landscapes are critical ecological systems.
5. Landscape Perception and aesthetics
  - Human perception and aesthetic values are a significant part of landscape planning decisions. Research on visual quality, landscape identity, and social meanings of place help align the outcome with public expectation.
6. Stakeholder participation and governance
  - Issues of policy, governance, stakeholder participation, and social learning are something planners have to take into account with great consideration as stakeholders and the government decide whether the project goes through or not.

== See also ==
- Landscape architecture
- Landscape manager
- Landscape ecology
- Landscape Institute
- Landscape urbanism
- Environmental impact assessment
- Urban design
- Growth management
- Principles of Intelligent Urbanism
- Sustainable city
- Sustainable landscape architecture
- European Landscape Convention

== Footnotes ==
- Landscape planning education in America: retrospect and prospect
- Ecological design and planning George F. Thompson and Frederick R. Steiner, (Wiley, 1997)
- Landscape planning : an introduction to theory and practice Hackett, Brian (Oriel, 1971)
- Landscape planning and environmental impact design Tom Turner (2nd ed UCL Press, 1998)
- Design with nature Ian L. McHarg ( Wiley, 1992)
- The living landscape: an ecological approach to landscape planning Steiner, Frederick R. (McGraw-Hill College, 1991)
