= Campus of the Massachusetts Institute of Technology =

College campus in Cambridge, Massachusetts, US

Coordinates: 42.3591°N 71.0934°W

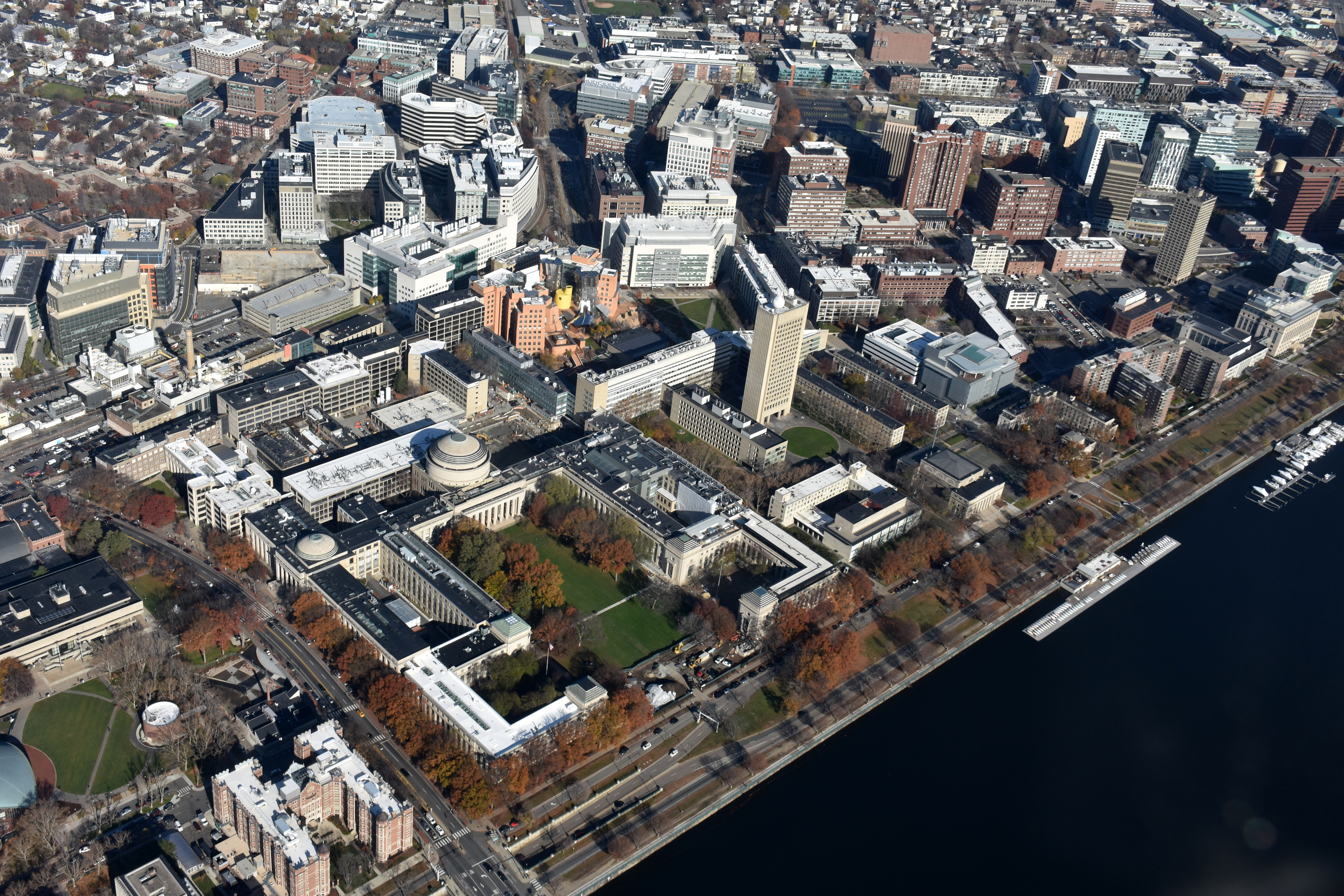
MIT's central campus, looking east from the Charles River Basin.

The Massachusetts Institute of Technology occupies a 168-acre (68 ha) tract in Cambridge, Massachusetts, United States. The campus spans approximately one mile (1.6 km) of the north side of the Charles River basin directly opposite the Back Bay neighborhood of Boston, Massachusetts.

The campus includes dozens of buildings representing diverse architectural styles and shifting campus priorities over MIT's history. MIT's architectural history can be broadly split into four eras: the Boston campus, the new Cambridge campus before World War II, the "Cold War" development, and post-Cold War buildings. Each era was marked by distinct building campaigns characterized by, successively, neoclassical, modernist, brutalist, and deconstructivist styles which alternatively represent a commitment to utilitarian minimalism and embellished exuberance.

== Campus organization ==
The original main campus consisted of Buildings 1–10 (with the exception of 9). Building 10, the location of the Great Dome, was designed to be the ceremonial main entrance. However, the actual street entrance leads from 77 Massachusetts Avenue into the lobby of Building 7, at the western end of the "Infinite Corridor", from which branch the rest of the original buildings.

Buildings east of Ames Street are prefixed with an E (e.g. E52, the Sloan Building); those west of Massachusetts Avenue start with a W (e.g., W20, the Stratton Student Center).

Buildings north of the Grand Junction Railroad tracks paralleling Vassar Street are prefixed with N, while those northerly structures that are also west of Massachusetts Avenue are designated with NW. Two buildings at the far west end of campus are designated "WW15" and "WW25". The prefix NE is used for buildings north of Main Street.

Rooms are identified by a number appended to the building number with a hyphen (e.g. Room 26–100, a classroom in Building 26). The practice of identifying buildings by number is a long-standing tradition at MIT. Although sometimes ridiculed as evidence of an "engineering mindset", and referred to as "a system that disorients outsiders", this system allows members of the MIT community to quickly locate a room they may never have seen before. This numbering system contrasts with the building identification at other nearby colleges. For example, at Harvard University, knowing the location of "Maxwell-Dworkin" will not help in locating "Claverson" or "Larsen"—no matter how many years of experience one may have, one either knows these locations or has no idea where they may be. Under the MIT numbering scheme, community members will know approximately where Building NW95 must be, even if they have never been near there.

Many buildings names which can be found on maps or carved near the entrance. Some locations have dual designations in common use (e.g. Huntington Hall, or 10–250).

=== Impact of layout on collaboration ===
The layout of MIT's campus reduces how often co-workers email or message each other. Because this layout encourages more in-person interaction, there has been an increase in the number of co-authored patents and publications.

Some buildings, like the Stata Center, are planned so that several research and teaching groups end up being colocated in one place. Large atriums, winding corridors, and communal work areas encourage spontaneous discussions. The Stata Center design reflects MIT’s long standing culture of experimentation.

== Boston Tech (1865–1910) ==
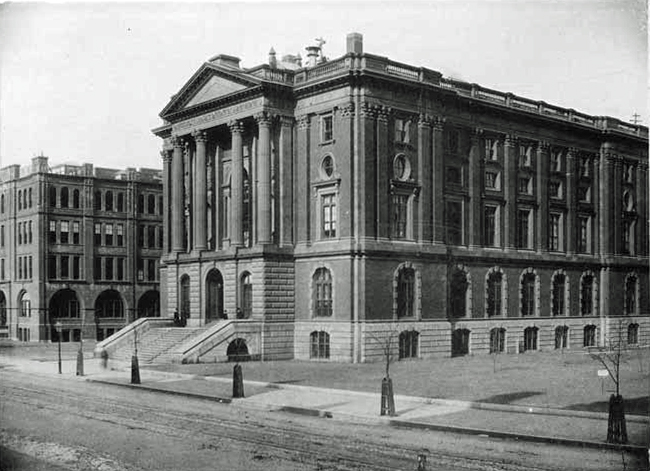
The original Rogers Building, MIT's first home

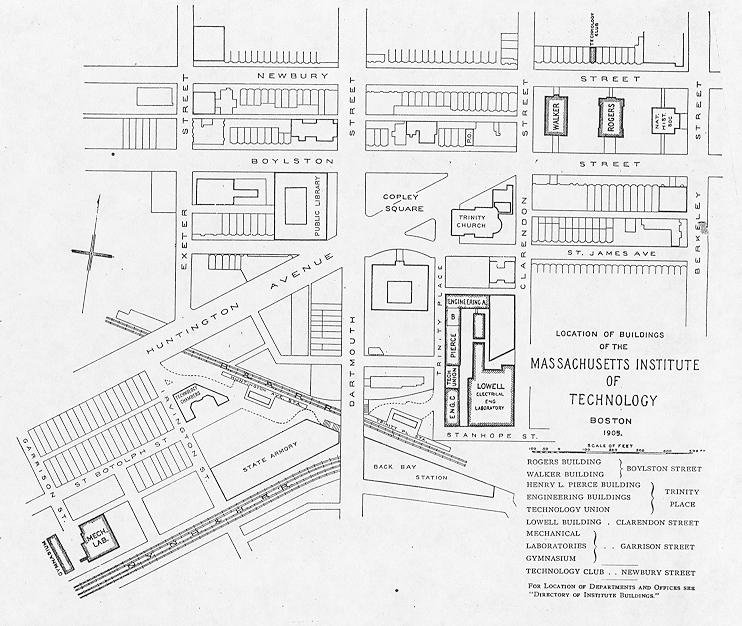
A 1905 map of MIT's Boston campus

Boston's Back Bay neighborhood was created from filled-in marshland along the Charles River over several decades. The City of Boston reserved several lots for churches, museums, and other community buildings. A lot bounded on the north and south by Newbury and Boylston streets, and to the east and west by Berkeley and Clarendon streets, was awarded to the Boston Society of Natural History and to the Massachusetts Institute of Technology.

William G. Preston designed three buildings to occupy the site, although the original plan for an "MIT Museum" was never built. The Natural History Society building, completed in 1862, occupied the easternmost third, facing Berkeley Street. The MIT building, later called the Rogers Building, occupied the center and faced Boylston Street. The building was not opened until 1865 owing to delays because of the Civil War. The five-story Rogers building featured a "grand tetra-style Corinthian portico" modeled on the Duke of Wellington's remodeled Apsley House.

MIT quickly outgrew this space as new schools, departments, and laboratories were founded. In 1886, the five-story (original) Walker Memorial building housing the Physics and Chemistry departments was built in the space to the west of the Rogers building. This original Walker Memorial building, designed by Carl Fehmer, consisted of a more subdued, industrial arcade motif compared to the surrounding fashionable buildings. As Jarzombek suggests, "the choice of this style, even for such a prominent urban space, was clearly MIT's and a testament to its desire to promote the ideals of scientific professionalism." More annexes, given utilitarian names "Engineering Buildings A, B, and C" were designed in the same industrial manner, and built between 1889 and 1900 on a site south of the Trinity Church.

After MIT's move to Cambridge in 1916, the original Rogers and Walker buildings were eventually torn down in 1939 to make way for the New England Mutual Life Insurance Company building. Their sibling structure, the Natural History Society building, has survived to the present day by hosting a succession of retail stores after its original tenant moved to the current location of the Museum of Science Boston in 1951. The city block that originally contained the Engineering Annexes is now the site where the John Hancock Tower stands. Thus, very few physical traces from MIT when it was "Boston Tech" remain in place in their original locations.

The names of Rogers and Walker were both re-applied to new MIT buildings (Building 7 and Building 50, respectively) erected across the Charles River in Cambridge, in 1939 and 1916, respectively.

== The New Technology (1910–1940) ==
MIT Cambridge campus map from 1916 when it moved there from Boston

=== Impetus ===
By the turn of the century, demands for new space for laboratories, offices, housing, and student unions were outstripping the land available in the now-fashionable Back Bay neighborhood, where real estate prices had risen rapidly. Other institutes of technology in Chicago and Pittsburgh, state universities founded under the Morrill Land-Grant Colleges Act, and private universities like Harvard, Princeton, Columbia, and Stanford were closing the gap on MIT's early lead on laboratory-based education, with large and modern laboratories placed amongst large, park-like campuses. MIT repeatedly resisted overtures from Harvard President Charles William Eliot to merge the schools, and after President Richard C. Maclaurin was elected in 1909, he began to search for sites to relocate the Institute.

A 50-acre (200,000 m^{2}) site in Cambridge, recovered from the Charles River and set amongst dirty factories and tenement housing, was ultimately selected for the construction of a new campus. Thomas Coleman du Pont, a graduate of MIT's Chemistry department, donated $500,000 to be used towards the purchase of the land under a promise from President Maclaurin that the first building constructed would be for Chemistry. The site abutted Massachusetts Avenue (which crossed the river on the Harvard Bridge) along which were many newly built neo-classical structures like Langdell Hall, Christian Science Center Church, and Symphony Hall on the Boston side, with which MIT's new Cambridge campus would have to compete. In Maclaurin's words, "We have a glorious site and glorious opportunities, but our task of design is not made more easy by the great expectations of Boston".

=== Initial proposals ===
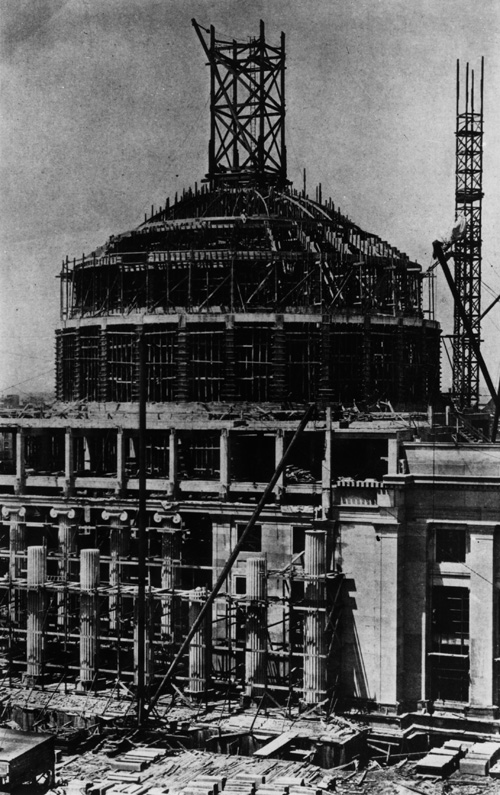
The Great Dome under construction in 1916

Early proposals for the campus came from Shepley, Rutan and Coolidge; Stephen Child; Constant-Désiré Despradelle; and John Ripley Freeman. Shepley's and Child's plans incorporated Georgian Revival styled, L-shaped, brick buildings set on symmetric grass avenues or quads, much like the recently completed Harvard Medical School, but were inappropriately sized for the industrial research that would occur within. Despradelle's Beaux-Arts proposal would have partitioned the campus into separate zones for academic, research, and residential activities, but its World's-Fair-like layout provided insufficient space for laboratories. His later iterations solved the laboratory space problems, but provided uncomfortable proximity and insufficient space for the residences as well as being enormously expensive.

After Despradelle's sudden death in 1912, Freeman's "Study No. 7" was thrust to the fore. His proposal, based on Taylorism, was "one-fifth architecture and four-fifths a problem of industrial engineering." He proposed connecting all departmental buildings to prevent the emergence of academic fiefdoms, to provide protection from bad weather, and to enable efficiencies of scale by building a massive, one million square-foot building incorporating the administrative, teaching, and research functions. The proposed five-story building resembled a large "E" with the base aligned to the river, with "cloistered" courtyards and a pedimented Doric exterior. Freeman also rejected using masonry walls, and proposed using reinforced concrete, a relatively new material that was then thought to be both expensive and unconventional.

President Maclaurin and MIT's executive committee sought to hire an established architect, rather than an ambitious engineer, to design the campus and briefly retained Cass Gilbert before conflicts with a determined Freeman drove him off.

=== Bosworth's design ===
Under the advice of John D. Rockefeller Jr., Maclaurin chose Rockefeller's personal architect, MIT class of 1889 graduate William Welles Bosworth, to lead the next round of designs. In no small part, he was chosen because of his willingness to work for clients with strong personal convictions. Bosworth was trained in the Beaux-Arts style and was influenced by the City Beautiful movement which was at its height at the time.

Bosworth's proposal retained many elements of the previous proposals: a large, multi-armed building with room for future expansion and a large central court, but also successfully integrated the dormitories into the rest of the complex. The campus would be oriented around two major east-west cross axes connecting the western academic half of campus with the residential eastern half of campus. Each half of campus would in turn be oriented around separate north-south axes, the western oriented its open green space towards the river and Boston while the eastern oriented its track and tennis courts northward into Cambridge. Bosworth's design was drawn so as to admit large amounts of light through exceptionally large windows on the first and second floors, many internal windows—not only on office doors but above door-level, and skylights over huge stairwells. However, later revisions began to incorporate more elements originally found in Freeman's designs such as double-loaded corridors and "open-grid, concrete structure with crossbeams supported by pairs of columns in the middle."

Not all of Bosworth's design was built. His plan for future expansion, which extended the neo-classical corridors in a grid fashion further north, was followed for Building 7 but not for later additions. Interior pedestrian circulation follows parts of the grid pattern, but thru access is not possible on all floors. North-south movement is possible through buildings 7, 9, 33, and 35; and 8, 26, and 36. East-west movement is possible through buildings 9, 13, 12, 16, and 56; and 35, 37, 39, 38, 34, 36, and 32. The 2018 construction of MIT.nano severed the previous north-south passage from building 4 to 12, 24, and 34. There are also semi-grid-like tunnels from building 14 north and east to buildings 18, 54, and 16/56. The exterior appearance of new buildings beyond 7 and 11 is completely different than the original set.

The original plan included dormitory quads on either side of Walker Memorial, which explains why it was surrounded by empty land when it was first constructed. Only the East Campus dorm was built in this area, and as larger parallels rather than a quad. Academic buildings and tennis courts now occupy most of this land, and most newer dorms were actually built or purchased west of Massachusetts Avenue. In the 21st century, new high-rise apartment dormitories for grad students have been built in the Kendall Square area, at the new easternmost extent of the MIT campus.

=== Maclaurin Buildings and Great Dome (1916) ===
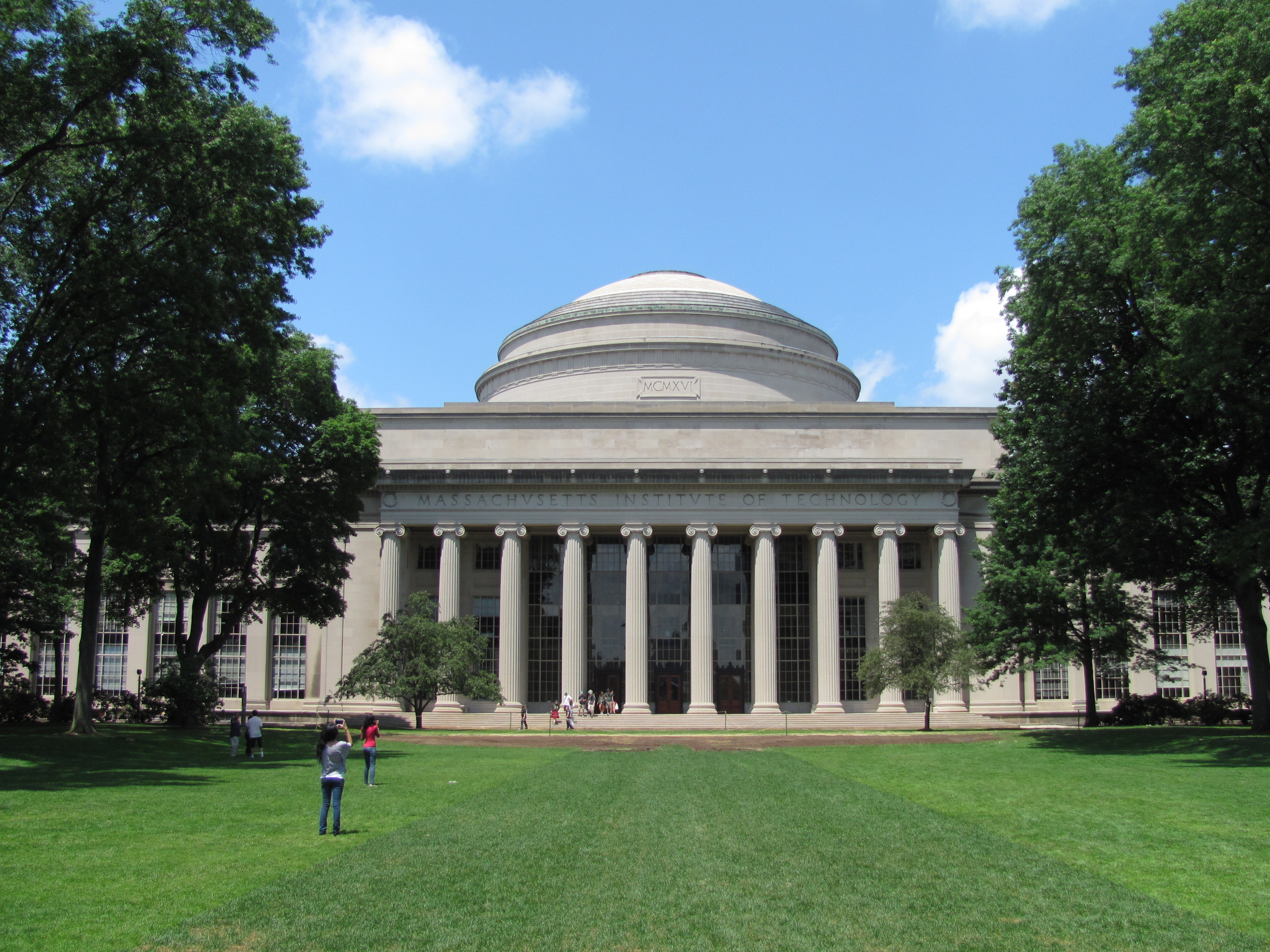
Killian Court, Building 10, and The Great Dome

The Maclaurin Buildings comprise Buildings 3, 4, and 10, and form a large U-shaped structure enclosing the section of Killian Court farthest from the Charles River. This is the outdoors area where formal Commencement (graduation) ceremonies occur every June, and is the classic view of MIT featured in many publicity photos. The buildings were built in 1913 to 1916 and were designed in the Neoclassical style by William Welles Bosworth. They were named in honor of MIT president Richard C. Maclaurin, who was instrumental in organizing MIT's move from Boston to "The New Technology" campus in Cambridge. The facade of Building 10 is dominated by a colonnade of 10 monumental columns of the classic Ionic order. The Brass Rat, MIT's class ring, features the Building 10 facade on the shank of each ring, including a portrayal of the Great Dome.

The Great Dome, which sits atop Building 10, was adapted from McKim, Mead, and White's Low Memorial Library at Columbia University, which was in turn a loose adaptation of the Pantheon in Rome. The Dome was originally planned to be a cavernous assembly hall, but budget limitations threatened to prevent construction of the Dome altogether. A smaller library – now the Barker Engineering Library – and lecture hall (10–250) instead filled the space. Architectural historian Mark Jarzombek later described the library space as a "capacious oculus [admitting] light into its center, and its perimeter surrounded by a row of Corinthian columns. Four curved topped aedicules [add] a counter-punctual element. More baroque in flavor that what one normally might have expected from Bosworth, the building seems in fact to be an inside-out quotation from Christopher Wren's St. Paul's Cathedral."

Bosworth noted that the columns of the Pantheon's porch are not placed along a straight line, but bow out a bit toward the central axis. This is a classical optical illusion also used in the Parthenon of Athens to make the line of columns appear straight. Bosworth replicated this technique at MIT; to observe it, one has to lie down and sight along the front of the steps.

Based on its psychological and numerical centrality to the main campus of the Institute, members of the MIT community sometimes humorously refer to the Great Dome as "The Center of the Universe".

=== Killian Court (1916) ===
Bosworth's plan was notable for rejecting the prevailing conventions of separated buildings and retreat from the urban area, as was found in other new American campuses. The Great Court, renamed Killian Court in 1974 after President James Rhyne Killian, faces the river and the Boston skyline. Killian Court was originally hard-paved, but was converted into a park-like area of grass and trees in the late 1920s. Today, Killian Court is the site of the annual Commencement ceremony.

=== Walker Memorial (1916) ===
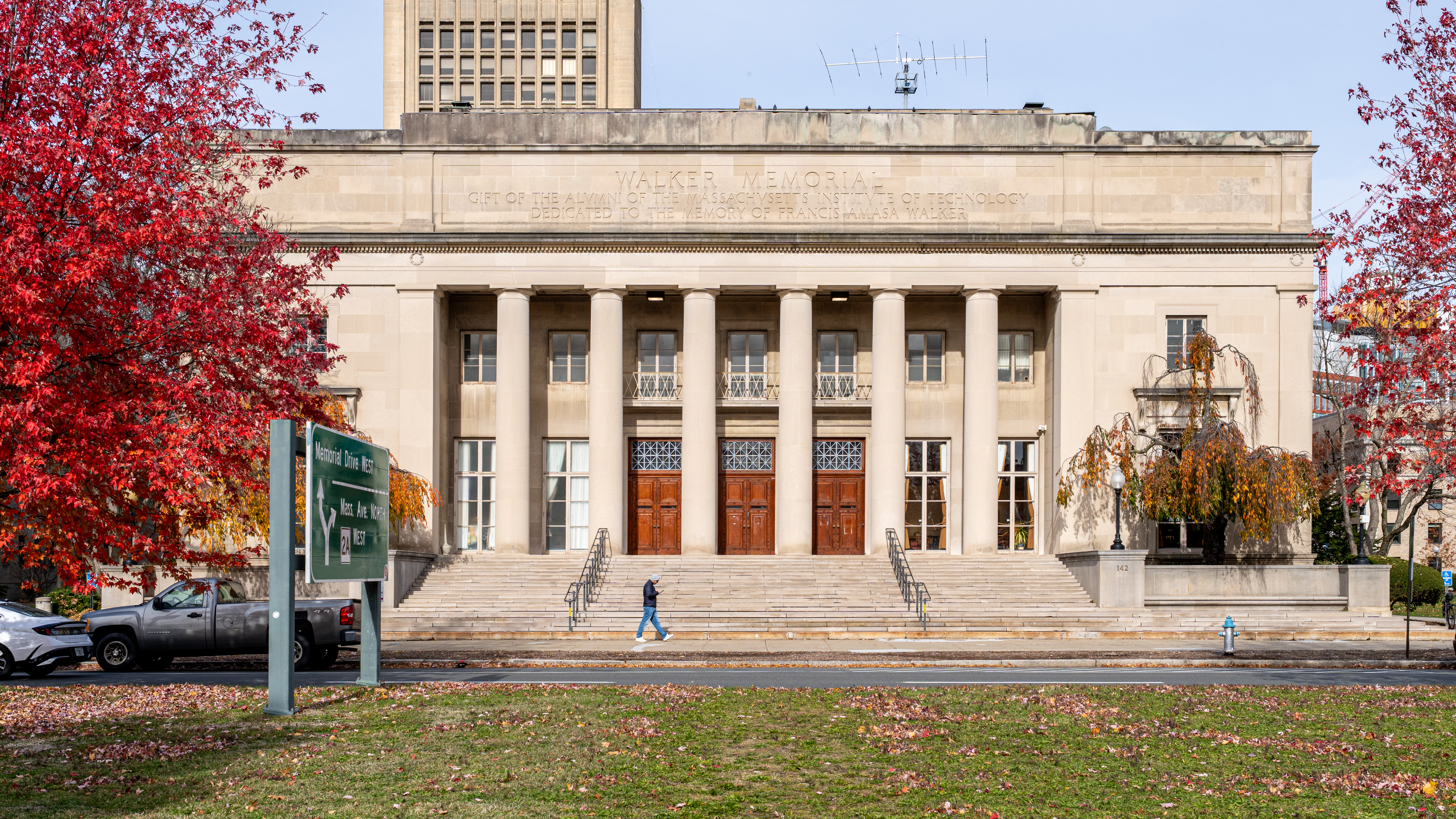
Francis Amasa Walker Memorial

Walker Memorial was dedicated to former MIT president (and general) Francis Amasa Walker, a staunch advocate for student life. The Memorial was to have been designed in a "relaxed classical style with a generous convex portico overlooking the Charles River". However, cost overruns forced the scale of many planned buildings to be altered. A gymnasium, which had previously been separate from the Memorial, was integrated into the top floor of the combined structure. Today, the gymnasium is used for dance and martial arts classes, informal basketball games, and for the administration of midterm and final exams for large classes.

Morss Hall, the ground floor dining area, was formerly used (in the recent past, as of 2004) as a dining hall, but is no longer regularly used as such. It remains open for special campus events, including banquets and formal dances. The walls of this double-height full-floor space are decorated with classical allegorical murals painted by Edwin Howland Blashfield (1869, Civil Engineering), who was one of the best-known American artists and muralists of his time. Completed in 1923 and in 1930, the 5 large panels symbolically portray the role of education in society, and the immense power of science and engineering for both good and evil.

Walker Memorial has also contained the administrative offices for many MIT student organizations. Among these organizations is W1MX, the MIT amateur radio society, which has installed several reconfigurable antennas visible on the roof, as well as on the nearby Green Building tower. MIT's Class A broadcast radio station, WMBR (Walker Memorial Basement Radio) has its studios in the basement, with an FM transmitter formerly located atop the Eastgate tower. The Muddy Charles Pub, administered by the MIT Graduate Student Council, is located on the first floor and has been serving MIT affiliates since 1968.

Over time, the Walker Memorial building interior has shown the effects of nearly a century of continuous use without major renovation. There were plans to make it the headquarters of the Music and Theater Arts Department, and to install new theatrical and performance spaces to accommodate a growing number of activities. As of 2015, funds were being raised and an architect had been selected, but no start or completion date had been projected. In March 2017, MIT announced a new Theater Arts Building (Building W97) located at 345 Vassar Street at the far western end of campus. Since the intent of the new building was to consolidate Music and Theater Arts into a single location, the future plans for the Walker Memorial building are unclear.

=== 70 Amherst Street (1916, formerly called Senior House) ===
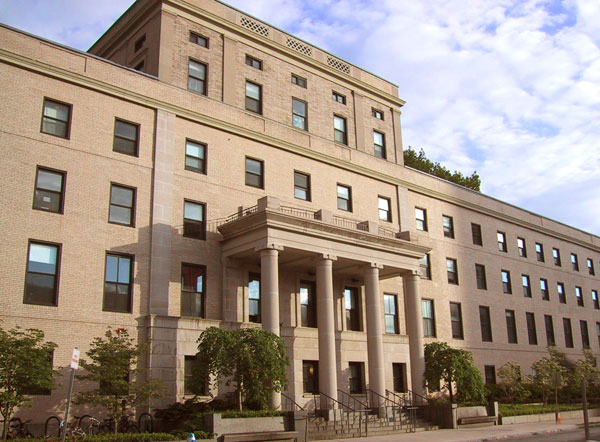
Entrance on Amherst Street

Senior House is an L-shaped building, designed by William Welles Bosworth. The Doric portico over the entrance was added in the 1990s. It was used from its construction as a dormitory for undergraduates, until its name was removed and the building was converted to unmarried graduate housing in fall 2017.

From the 1960s to 2017, the dorm had a counterculture that included student-painted murals, tolerance for drug use, acceptance of people who did not fit into mainstream culture (including LGBT students), a tire swing, a red-white-and blue skull logo, the nickname "Haus", and the motto "Sport death, only life can kill you". The annual Steer Roast festival featured loud music, pit roast of a cow, and mud wrestling. Former residents include Roger Dingledine, developer of Tor. In 2016, MIT cited data that 21.1% of Senior House residents failed to graduate, compared to the campus average of 7.7%, and a confidential survey found a higher incidence of drug use than other dorms. The administration began a turnaround project that closed the dorm to freshmen and increased tutoring, mental health, and addiction services. After continued evidence of drug dealing in the building, the administration cancelled the 2017 Steer Roast, and in July announced conversion to graduate housing. Students protested and some faculty supported the move. The murals were covered and remaining undergraduates assigned to other dorms.

=== Gray House (1917) ===
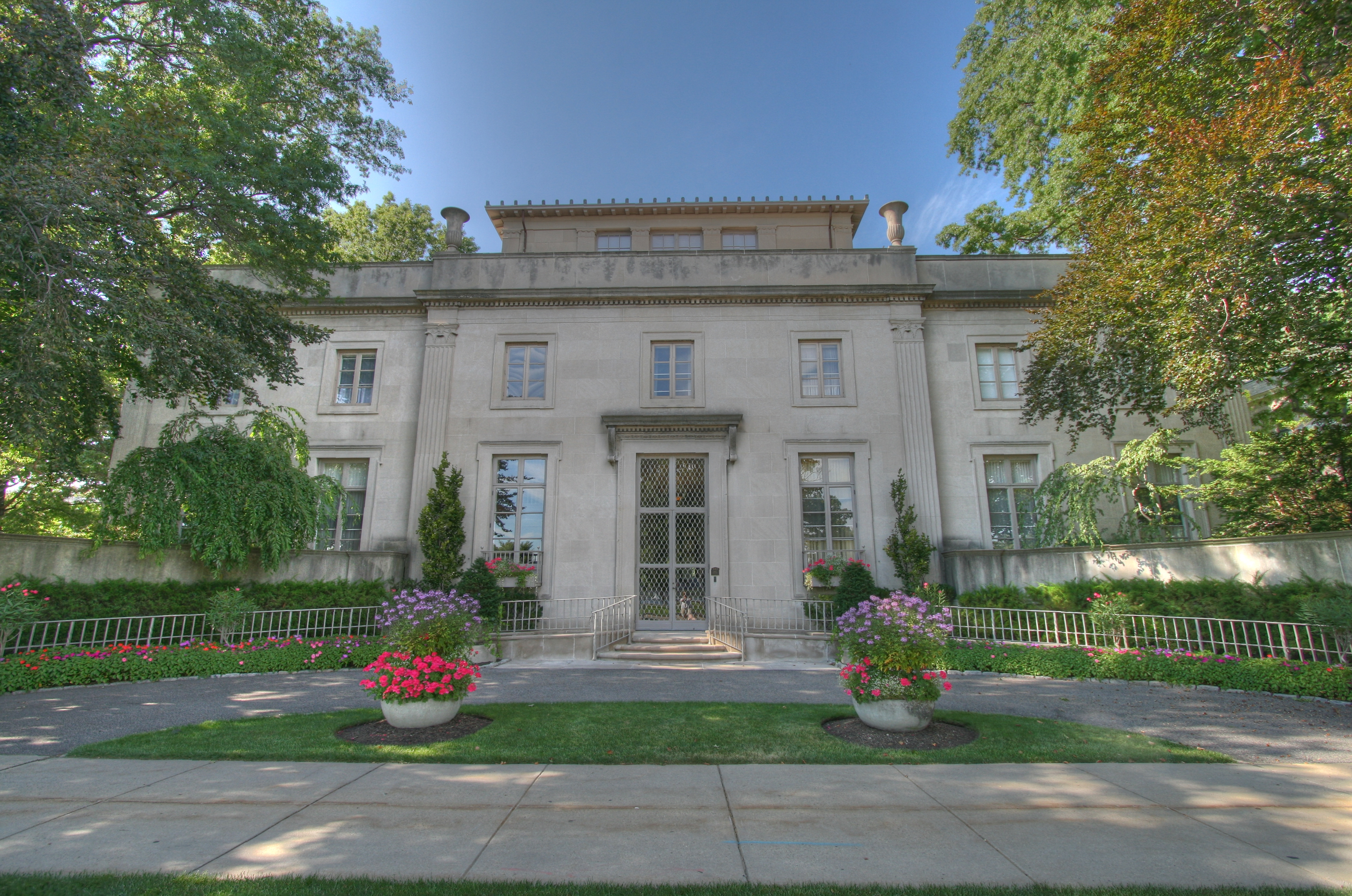
Gray House

The Gray House is named after Paul Edward Gray, the fourteenth president of MIT (1980–1990). This residence for the MIT president is located adjacent to Senior House, and cradles inside the elbow of the L-shaped dormitory. The President's House was the last part of the original Bosworth campus to be constructed, and consists of a three-story structure with a simple, rectangular floor plan that incorporates a ballroom on the top floor.

=== Rogers Building (1937) ===
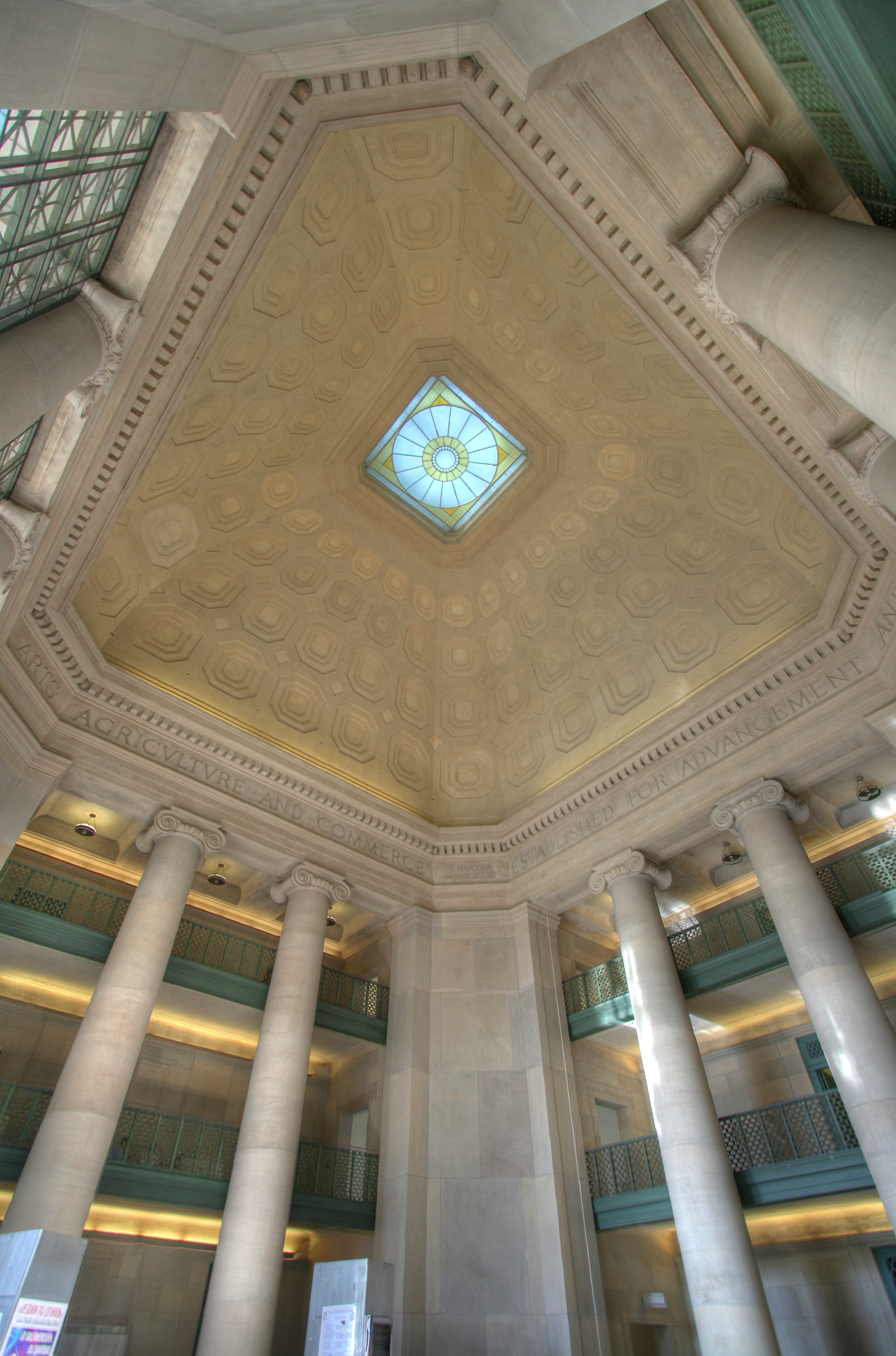
Building 7 atrium

The Rogers Building, named for MIT founder William Barton Rogers, is the second building of that name, the original having been demolished on its Back Bay site some years after MIT moved to Cambridge. Located at 77 Massachusetts Avenue, it is the official address of the entire Institute and serves as the entrance to the Infinite Corridor, the main pedestrian path connecting east campus with west campus. The Rogers Building was not a part of the original campus, but was built as a part of MIT's extension of the original Bosworth plan along Massachusetts Avenue. It was designed by Bosworth and Harry J. Carlson.

The spacious lobby (called Lobby 7 after its building number) is an impressive vestibule topped by a small dome that rejects the neoclassical tradition of reducing scale between the interior and exterior, with the result that the "inner space remains at the less intimate urban scale." The glass oculus at the top was blacked out during World War II but was restored during a renovation in 2000. The School of Architecture and Planning is housed around the dome and the lobby court.

== Wartime and post-war buildings (1940–1960) ==
=== Alumni Pool (1940) ===
The Alumni Pool (Building 57) was designed by Lawrence B. Anderson and Herbert L. Beckwith. The building was one of the first significant examples of modernist, International Style design in the United States. In 2000, during the building of the adjoining Stata Center, the building was restored and re-colored. Its walled-in garden to the south was removed and replaced by a more open landscaping. Nonetheless, the building still retains much of its early modernist sensibility, unornamented surfaces and simple functional design.

=== Building 20 (1942–1996) ===
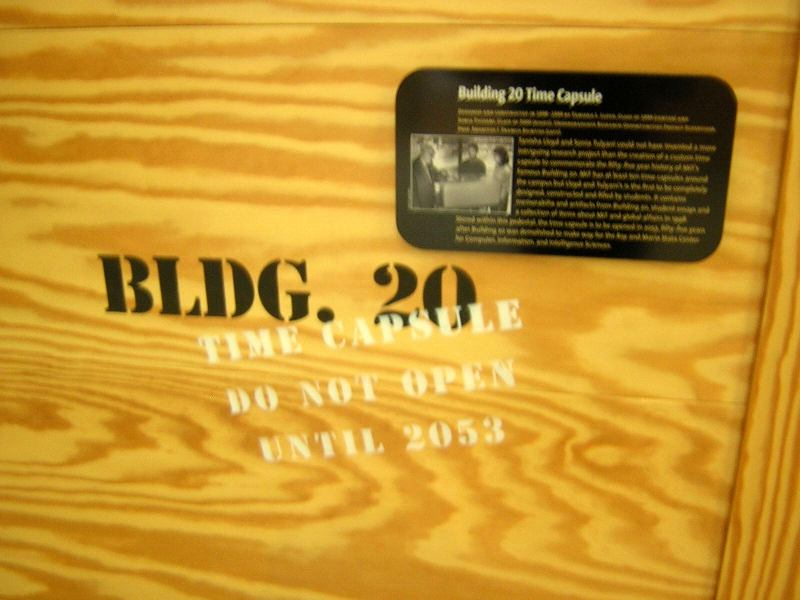
Building 20 time capsule to be opened in 2053. Until then, it is on display in the Stata Center, which replaced the older structure.

Building 20 was built during World War II as a temporary building to house part of the Radiation Laboratory. Over the course of fifty-five years, its "temporary" nature allowed research groups to have more space, and to make more creative use of that space, than was possible in more respectable buildings. Professor Jerome Y. Lettvin once quipped, "You might regard it as the womb of the Institute. It is kind of messy, but by God it is procreative!"

Building 20 became a significant place for innovation, primarily because of its adaptable and versatile nature. Its users, including researchers and students, rapidly altered the space by rewiring, drilling, and rearranging rooms to meet their requirements. The absence of constraints and rules within Building 20 encouraged spontaneous interactions and interdisciplinary teamwork. This freedom from pre-defined limitations allowed for a fluid exchange of ideas across disciplines, fostering novel approaches and innovative solutions.

Eventually, Building 20 was demolished to make way for the Stata Center (also called Building 32), an architectural project designed by Frank Gehry in 2004. However, as some have pointed out, a flexible building alone does not guarantee innovation—if institutional structures discourage interdisciplinary collaboration, the potential enabled by spatial flexibility may never be realized. This design, meant to continue the creativity embodied by Building 20 through bold architecture, hindered the collaboration it aimed to promote, as its complex hallways and areas sometimes caused confusion and isolation among its occupants.

Matthew Wisnioski adds that while the Stata Center aimed to symbolize innovation, it lacked the natural adaptability that made Building 20 a true hub for ideas. His broader work critically examines the ideological narrative surrounding the “MIT model” of innovation, arguing that this model loses much of its meaning when applied to different global contexts—especially in places like Russia, where institutions remain rigid and compartmentalized. The imposed architectural vision of creativity did not necessarily provide functional support for the evolving needs of its users.

Specifically, Building 20 exemplified occupant-driven adaptation, evolving alongside its users' requirements due to its highly flexible and unrestrictive design. In contrast, the architecturally complex Stata Center illustrates how functional innovation often relies on versatile, organically developed environments rather than predetermined physical structures.

=== Westgate (1945 and 1963) ===
Westgate was first established to provide student housing for the large numbers of veterans returning to study after World War II. The demand for housing was unprecedented both in quantity as well as in quality; students often were married and many had children to care for. A temporary community persisted for over a decade before the decision was made to create more-permanent housing for married students.

In its current incarnation, completed in 1963, Westgate consists of several low-rise buildings associated with a high-rise tower.

=== Rockwell Cage (1947) ===
The Rockwell Cage (W33) was designed by Herbert L. Beckwith and opened in 1947. The large structure was originally used by the military for indoor drills, and then declared as surplus. The structure was obtained by then-Athletic Director Ivan J. Geiger before the opening of the DuPont Athletic Center. Geiger was also key in transforming the Cage into MIT's basketball venue.

Rockwell Cage was named for Dr. John Rockwell, MIT class of 1896. He was a top athlete while a student, and returned in 1927 as the president of the Advisory Council for Athletics. Rockwell is currently the official venue for MIT basketball and volleyball, although the space, which spans three and a half basketball courts, is also used for collegiate and non-collegiate tournaments in other sports (such as gymnastics), as well as recreational badminton. In the fall of 2006 and 2007, the Rockwell Cage was the venue for the Northeast regional matches in the NCAA Division III Women's Volleyball Championships.

The Rockwell Cage is part of the larger, interconnected Department of Athletics, Physical Education, and Recreation (DAPER) Complex, which is often referred to collectively as the Z-Center.Rockwell is in the center of the complex, and is connected to the DuPont Athletic Center, Zesiger Center, and the Johnson Athletic Center.

=== Baker House (1949) ===
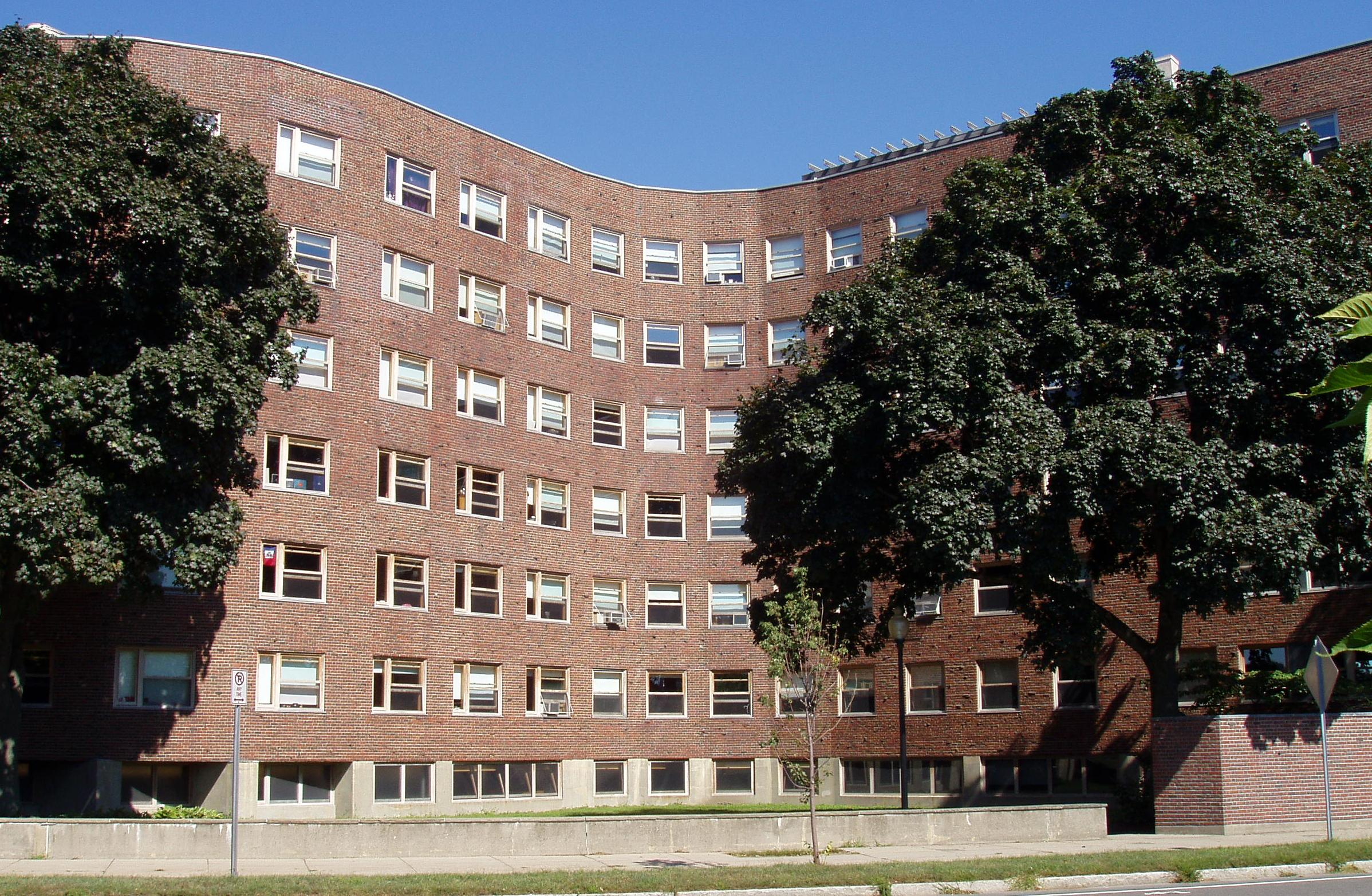
Detail of Baker House facade onto the Charles River

Alvar Aalto, a Finnish architect, designed Baker House. It has an undulating shape which allows most rooms a view of the Charles River, and gives many of the rooms a wedge-shaped layout. Baker House has six floors, with rooms for 1–4 people, and features a largely brick interior with wooden furniture and trim. The basement level contains Baker Dining, one of the six residential dining halls on campus.

Aalto also designed the furniture, much of which was intended to fit in specific rooms in order to maximize the limited space. Several of these furniture pieces were given various animal names. Each resident has a large, wheeled wardrobe (no closets in the brick rooms) called an "elephant" and thigh-high rolling case of drawers called an "armadillo," which fits neatly under the desks. Occupants of the largest singles, called "couches" because they are large enough to accommodate such furniture, also have free-standing sets of shelving called "giraffes." The giraffe is so-named because the piece consists of a pole, which is pressed into the floor and ceiling and thus is position-adjustable, adorned with several shelves that protrude in one direction and only rise to waist height, creating a giraffe-like shape. Many residents choose to flip their giraffes upside-down in order to have more floor space.

=== Hayden Memorial Library (1950) ===
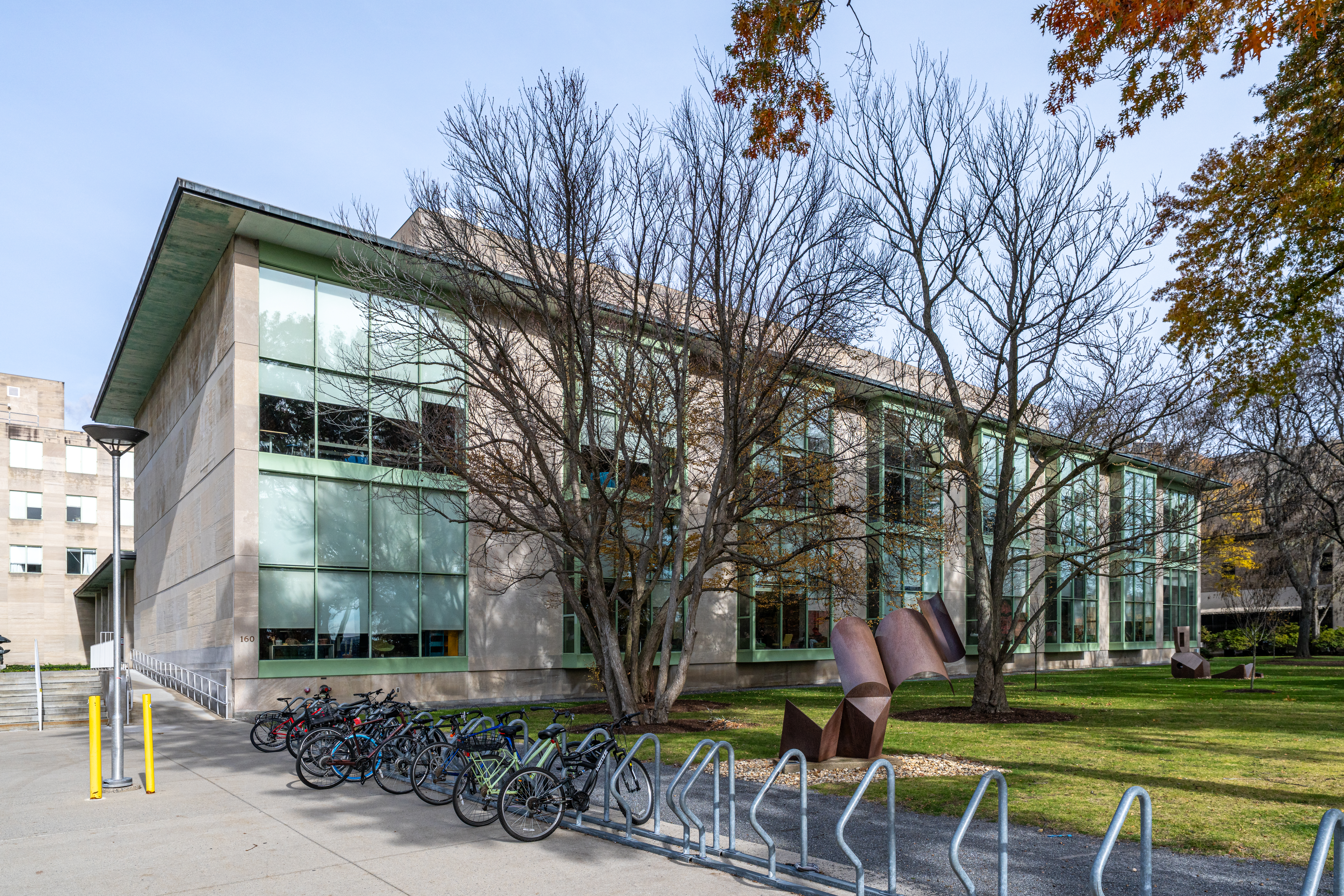
Hayden Memorial Library (Building 14)

The Charles Hayden Memorial Library building is located adjacent to Building 2 along Memorial Drive. Built in response to the Lewis Committee findings, it originally housed all of the humanities faculty, although rapid growth of these departments has since required much more space. The building features large 2-story bay-windows overlooking both the Charles River to the south and Eastman Court to the north, as well as high ceilings in the library spaces.

In 2020-2021, the first two floors of Hayden Library were completely reorganized and rebuilt to add a cafe, meeting rooms, and spaces for collaborative work. The previously underused outdoors courtyard at the core of the building was better connected and integrated into library functions. The entire first floor is now 24-hour accessible to active members of the MIT community.

=== MIT Chapel (1955) ===
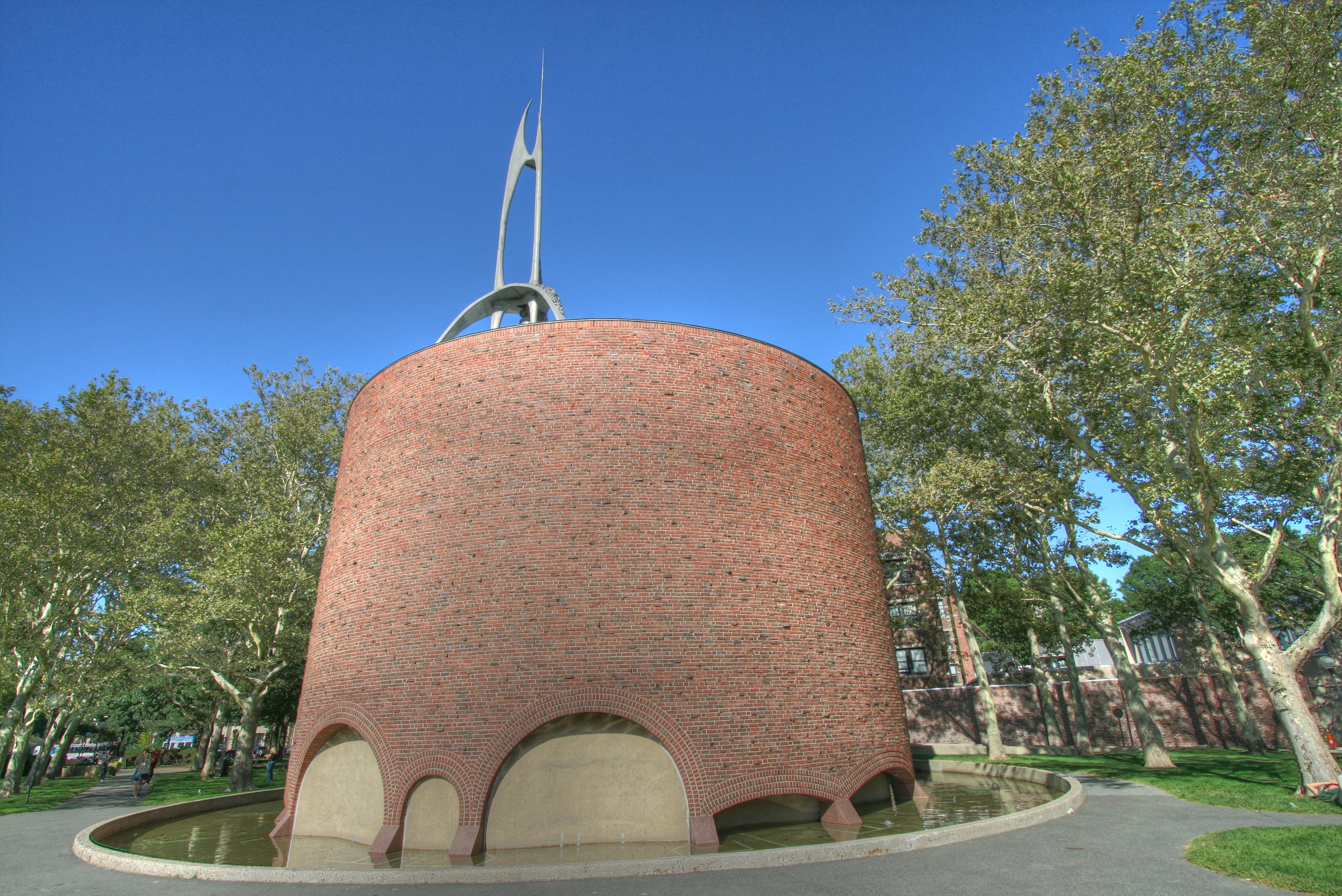
MIT Chapel

Eero Saarinen, a Finnish architect, designed the non-denominational MIT Chapel. The chapel exterior consists of a plain brick cylinder 33 feet (10 m) tall, topped with an aluminum bell tower by sculptor Theodore Roszak. The building is encircled by a shallow moat, that defines it as an island of serenity. Reflections from the water bounce up into the interior of the chapel through hidden windows. On the interior, Saarinen created undulating walls that focus on the chapel's altar. The sculptor Harry Bertoia designed the suspended metallic screen behind the altar.

=== Kresge Auditorium (1955) ===
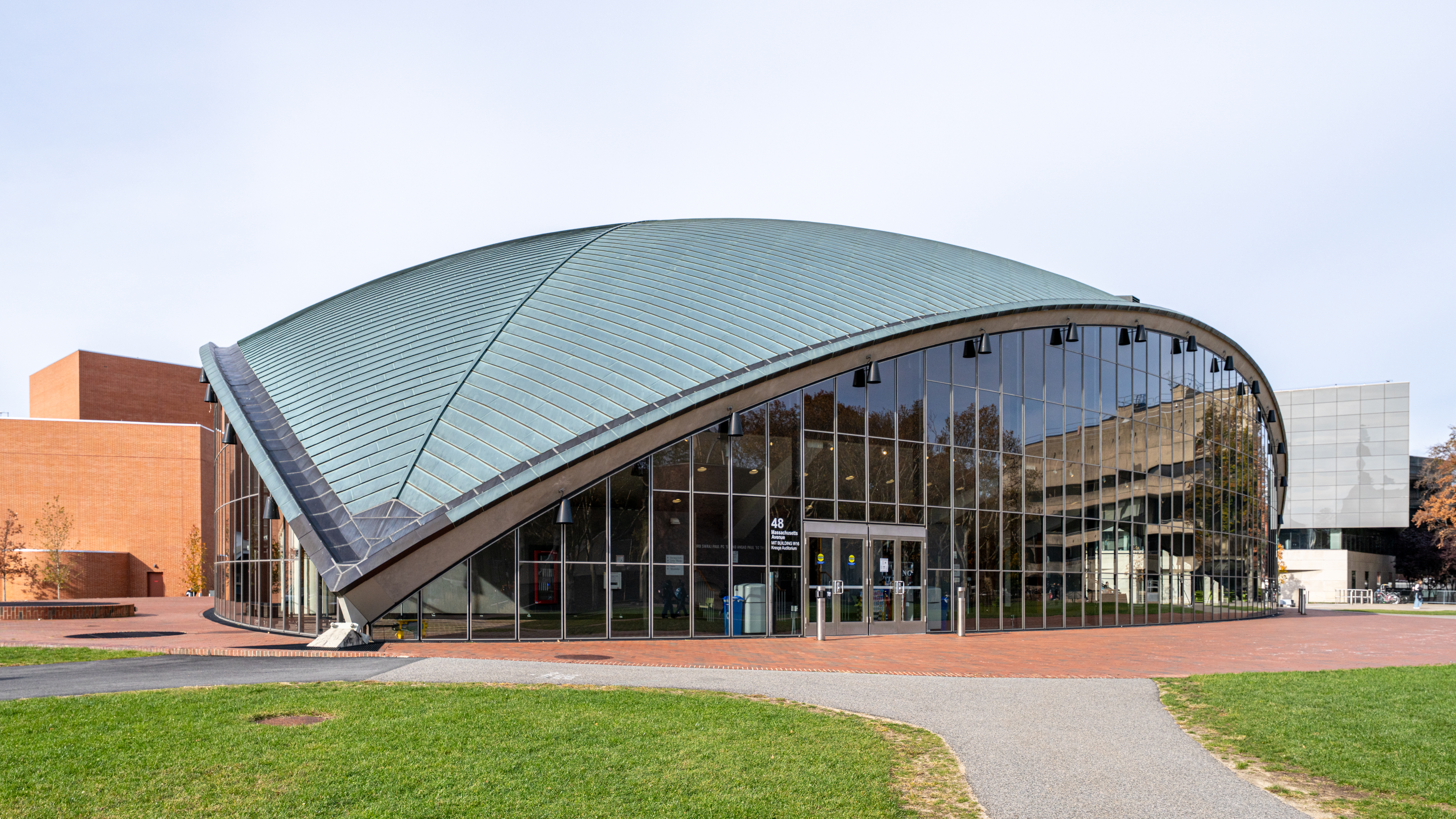
Exterior of Kresge Auditorium looking west

The Auditorium was intended as a type of university meeting hall, those words being, in fact, inscribed over the entrance. Its domed roof is exactly one-eighth of a sphere.

=== DuPont Athletic Center (1959) and Gymnasium (1903) ===
The DuPont Athletic Center and DuPont Gymnasium, Buildings W32 and W31, respectively, are located at the east end of the interconnected Main DAPER Complex. Building W31, the gymnasium, was originally built in 1903 as a State Armory, but was acquired by MIT in 1957 and converted to a gymnasium in an early example of "adaptive re-use" on the MIT campus.

The buildings are named for David Flett DuPont, who contributed a million dollars toward the improvement of athletic facilities, whose bequest also facilitated the building of twelve outdoor tennis courts. DuPont, as the two buildings are collectively known, was the third athletic building constructed on campus, and the second component of what is now the DAPER Complex (often collectively known as the Z-Center). The Athletic Center (W32) is connected to and immediately west of the Gymnasium (W31), and adjacent on the other side to the Rockwell Cage and the Zesiger Center. W32 houses MIT's fencing, pistol, and rifle teams, while W31 is home to gymnastics, volleyball, and wrestling (although they may compete in the Rockwell Cage). The T-club Lounge is located at the DuPont Athletic Center and is the main venue for DAPER exercise classes.

Building W31 was also home to MIT's Venture Mentoring Services, founded in 2000 and located on the 3rd floor, which have since decamped to Building E38 in Kendall Square.

== Second Century Fund (1960–1990) ==
The Second Century Convocation (1961), commemorated the 100th anniversary of MIT's founding charter, and spearheaded a major fund-raising and construction drive. The period between 1960 and 1990 was marked by a drastic increase in the size of the campus, and nearly continuous construction activity, tapering off somewhat in the late 70s and 80s.

Over the years, MIT has made an effort to bring noted architects to campus for particular commissions.

=== McCormick Hall (1963) ===
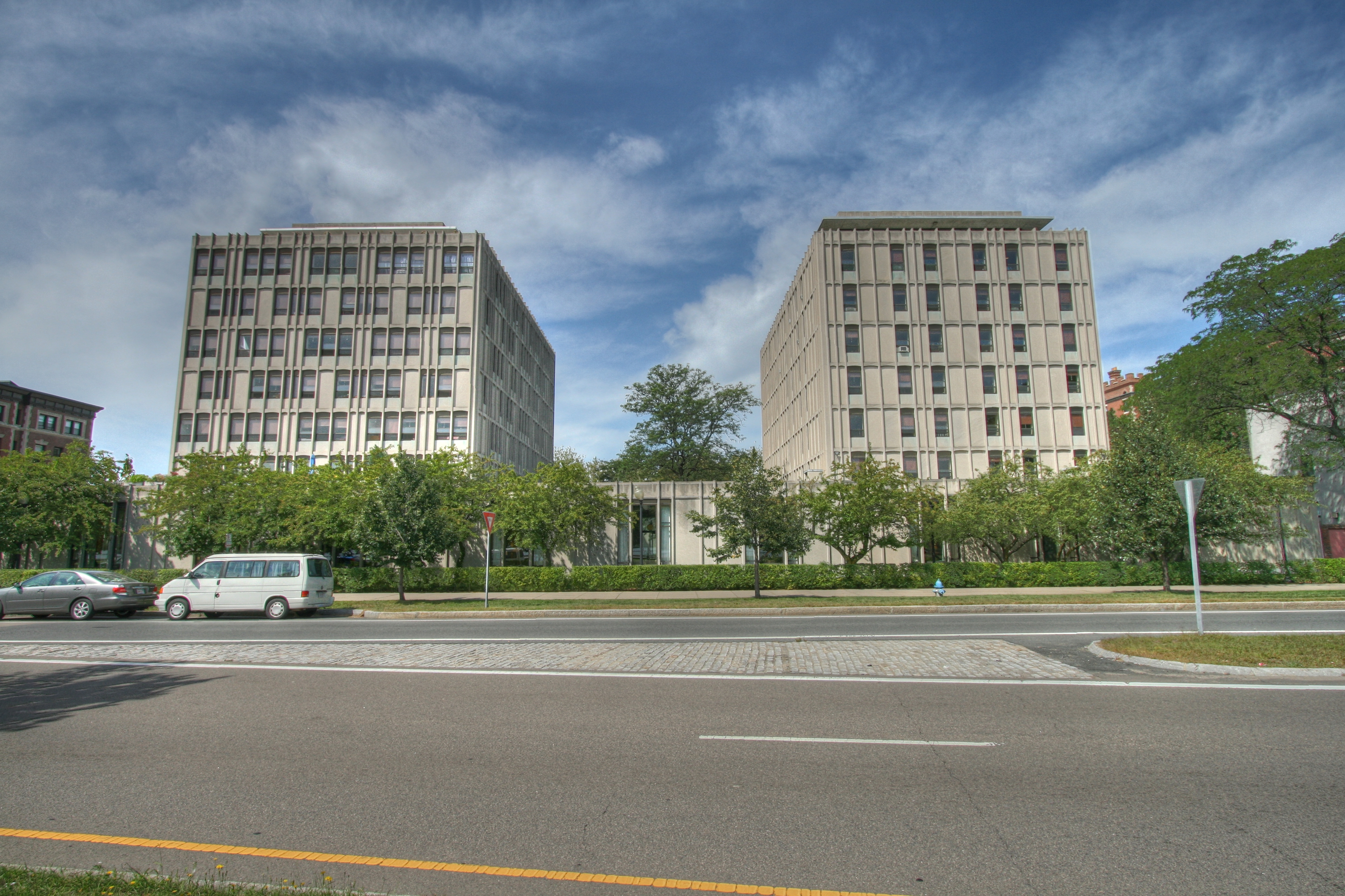
McCormick Hall

Although women had been enrolling at MIT since the 1880s, they constituted a tiny minority of the total undergraduate population and lived in a town house across the river. In 1959, MIT released a report, The Woman at MIT, which outlined the need to expand residential and social opportunities for female students. In 1960, Katharine Dexter McCormick '04 pledged $1.5 million towards the construction of an on-campus female dormitory.

Professor Herbert L. Beckwith was named architect of the project and he proposed a pair of towers on a riverside plot between Memorial Drive and the Kresge Court. Construction required the relocation of a Catholic nursing order, busy parking lot, and existing student housing. Building was broken into two phases: the West Wing was completed in 1963 and the East Wing was completed in 1968. The towers are connected by public spaces like a dining hall, dance studio, and music room at the ground floor. The building has attracted some criticism for its inefficient use of space, but it was renovated in the late 1990s.

=== Hermann Building (1965) ===
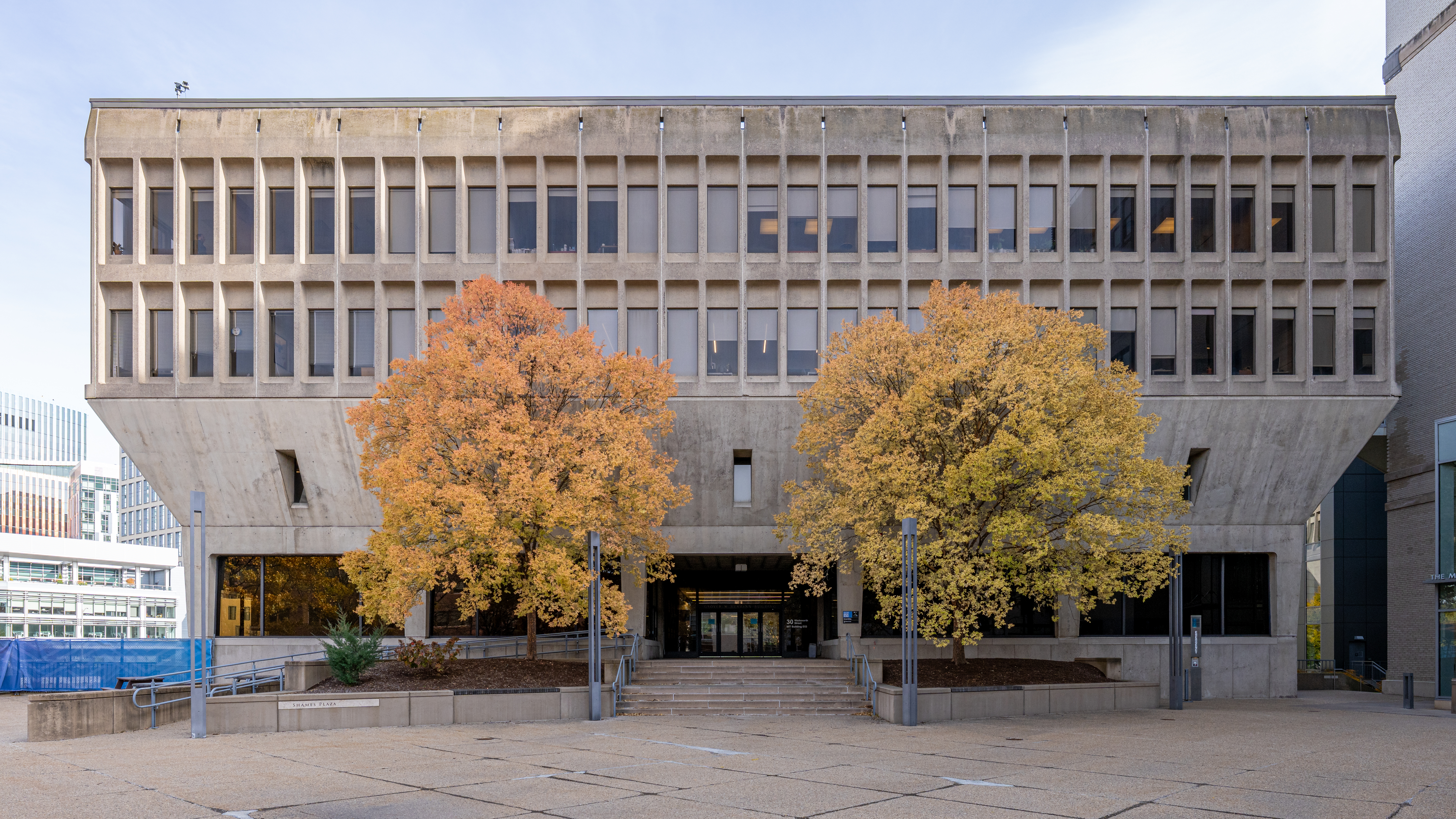
Hermann Building (2025)

The Grover M. Hermann Building (E53) houses Dewey Library and the Department of Political Science. As the Sloan School of Management expanded like other departments after the war, it quickly faced a shortage of space in its original building at 50 Memorial Drive (E52) which was only acquired in 1952. Professor Eduardo F. Catalano prepared a Sloan Campus Plan incorporating a plaza connecting a new academic building, Building E52, and parking. Grover Hermann of the Martin Marietta Company contributed funds for the four-story building set on a plinth. The building has been criticized by its inhabitants for its lack of natural light and "fortress architecture."

=== Eastgate (1967, demolished c. 2022) ===
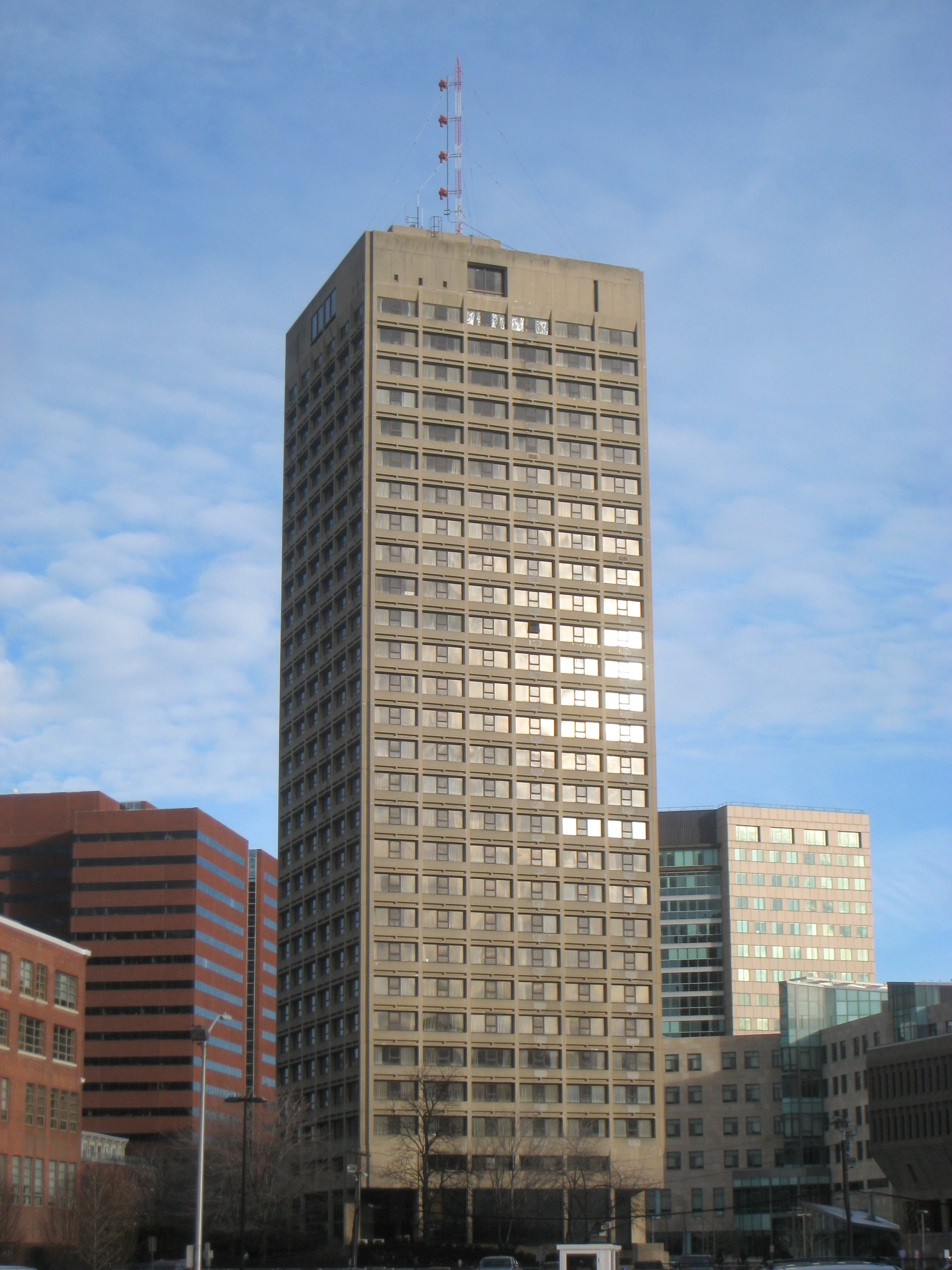
Eastgate Apartments (demolished c.2022)

The reinforced concrete Eastgate (E55) tower was completed and first occupied in August 1967. The building hosted family housing (students with spouses/partners and/or children) as well as a day care center. The tower was topped by a radio antenna mast for MIT's Class A broadcast radio station, WMBR (Walker Memorial Basement Radio, 88.1 FM).

Around 2022, the concrete tower was completely disassembled and removed, to clear the site for construction of "Kendall Site 2" (200 Main Street), a mixed-use lab/office/retail building. Replacement apartment dormitory space for grad students has been constructed nearby, at "Kendall Site 4" (E37, 290 Main Street).

=== Stratton Student Center (1968) ===
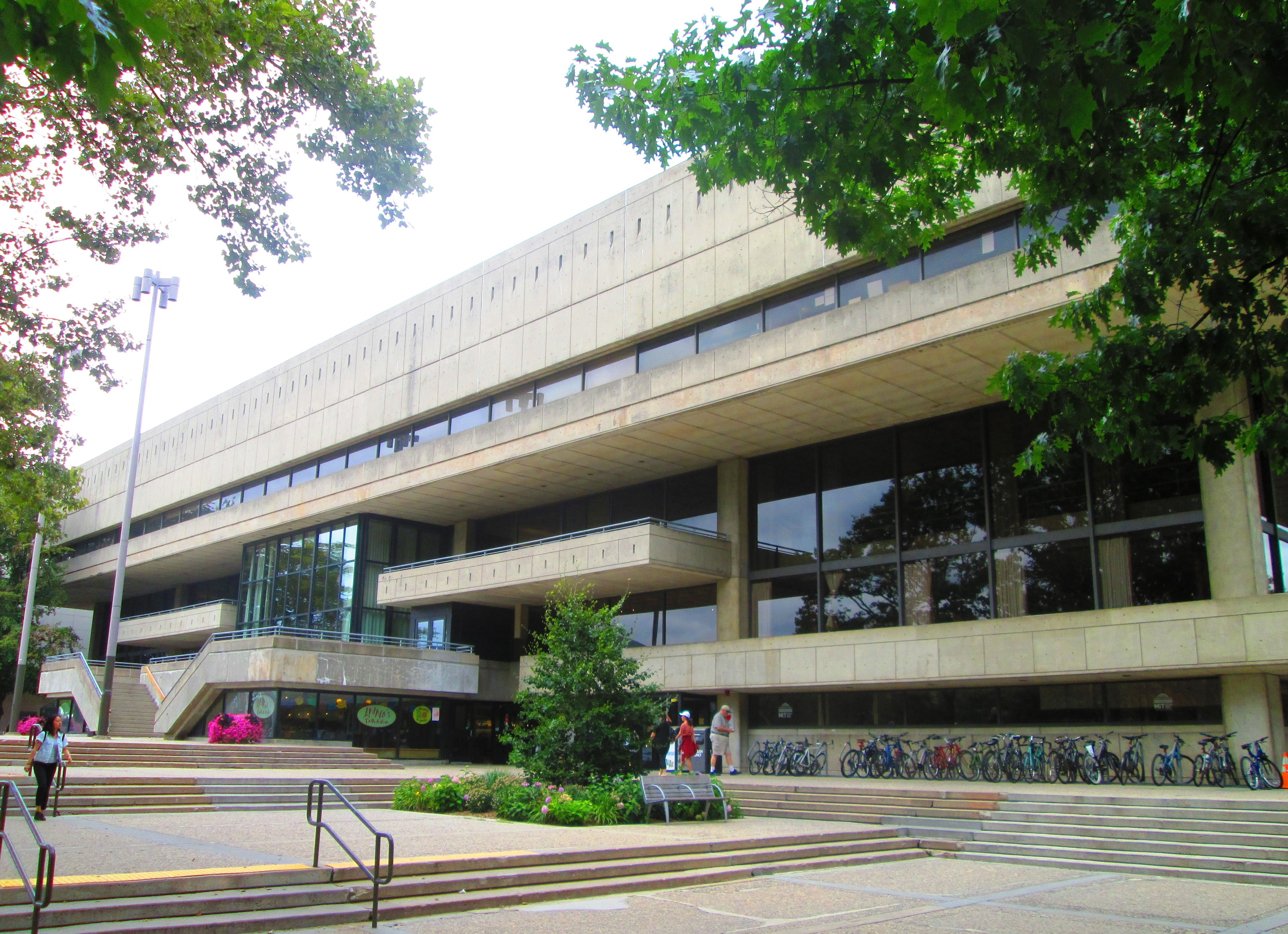
Stratton Student Center in 2017

Walker Memorial had originally served as the home for many student activity groups for several decades, but the growing post-war student population required the construction of a new and larger building. The first proposals originated in 1955 after the opening of Kresge Auditorium and Chapel had firmly planted MIT's presence on the other side of Massachusetts Avenue. Saarinen was again retained to design the new structure, but was dropped after his proposal met with resistance from faculty and donors.

Professor Eduardo F. Catalano replaced Saarinen in 1961 and proposed a structure that would house meeting and practice rooms as well as commercial areas like a post office, tailor, barbershop, book store, and bowling alley. The proposed building was a monumentally imposing structure representing a high form of brutalism and included large glass windows, balconies, and terraced staircases. The building was approved in 1963 and dedicated to outgoing President Julius A. Stratton in 1965. Although initially well received, the complex design of the interior, a lack of storage space, heavy use by students, and austere exterior led to a major renovation in the late 1980s.

A strip of stores and offices was on the site of this building until it burnt down in 1961. WGBH's first offices and studios were there, as well as many businesses that catered to MIT students.

In February 2023, a major pipe break caused extensive damage to the interior of the building, requiring its evacuation and shutdown. This accelerated and complicated an existing plan to close the building around June 2023 for a major renovation. The building was only partially re-opened, and then completely closed on April 16, 2023 for renovations.

=== Buildings designed by I. M. Pei ===
I. M. Pei & Partners designed a number of MIT buildings, and produced a master plan for the southeast corner of the central campus. Pei was a graduate of MIT's Department of Architecture (BArch 1940).

==== Green Building (1964) ====
By the late 1950s, many smaller but rapidly expanding departments were outgrowing their spaces. Professor Robert R. Shrock solicited Cecil H. Green '23, the founder of Texas Instruments, for a new building to house the geology and meteorology departments in a new Center for Earth Sciences. As Bosworth's plans for residential life on East Campus had not been fully realized, many departments had aspirations for utilizing the open space in Eastman Court. Pei and Hideo Sasaki proposed siting a tall building in East Campus and breaking MIT's architectural tradition of "horizontality" The tower has some functional purpose, since its roof supports meteorological instruments and radio communications equipment, plus a white spherical radome enclosing long-distance weather radar apparatus.

The tower rises 21 stories to 295 feet (90 m), breaking Cambridge's previous 80-foot (24 m) restriction on building height. However, the footprint of every floor measures only 60 by 120 feet (18 by 36m), which research groups quickly outgrew, forcing some of them to disperse elsewhere on campus. The isolated prominence of the building and its relative proximity to the open river basin also increased wind loads at its base, which prevented people from entering or leaving the building through the hinged main doors on windy days. Revolving doors were installed at the ground floor entries to ameliorate this problem somewhat. It is incorrectly rumored that Alexander Calder's Big Sail, situated in front of the building, was meant to deflect these winds. The sculpture is situated too far from the building entryway to have much effect on wind velocities there.

The Green Building remains the only academic tower on campus, and faculty insistence as well as logistical realities have continued MIT's previous "horizontal continuity".

==== Dreyfus Building (1970) ====
The Dreyfus Building (Building 18) houses the Chemistry Department. It is named in memory of Hubert Dreyfus, who had now correctly predicted the failure of purely symbolic AI techniques pursued by early researchers in the building, but was at the time ousted from MIT. A linear building, it parallels Eastman Laboratory (Building 6) to the west, and architecturally evokes a horizontal version of the Green Building tower which rises to its east. The floorplan deviates from MIT's traditional central corridor scheme by placing the laboratory and office space away from the windows by means of exterior corridors. The interior space consists of a research community of graduate students working in laboratory modules at the center, and faculty offices, lobbies, and teaching areas at each end of the building. A major renovation to the 132,000-square-foot (12,300 m^{2}) building was completed in 2003.

The surrounding courtyard area is known as Eastman Court. A dozen Adirondack chairs were installed in the court in 2017.

==== Landau Building (1976) ====
The Landau Building (Building 66), named in honor of chemical engineer Ralph Landau, houses the Chemical Engineering Department. It is shaped as a 30-60-90 triangle, with the sharpest point directed toward Ames Street. The unusual shape has earned the building a nickname, "The Triangle Building," deviating from the usual practice of referring to campus buildings by number.

==== Wiesner Building (1985) ====
The Wiesner building (Building E15) houses the MIT Media Lab and the List Visual Arts Center and is named in honor of former MIT president Jerome Wiesner and his wife Laya. The building is very box-like, a motif that is consistently repeated in both the interior and exterior design evoking a sense of boxes packed within each other.

The building is notable for the level of collaboration between the architect and artists. It stands apart from the surrounding neighborhood with its flat, gridded skin make of white, modular metal panels. The building's exterior was designed by Kenneth Noland is meant as a metaphor of technology through the grids of graph paper and number matrices while also quoting the corridor-like morphology of the rest of the MIT campus. Scott Burton, Alan Shields, and Richard Fleischner also collaborated extensively in the final design of the internal atria and external landscaping.

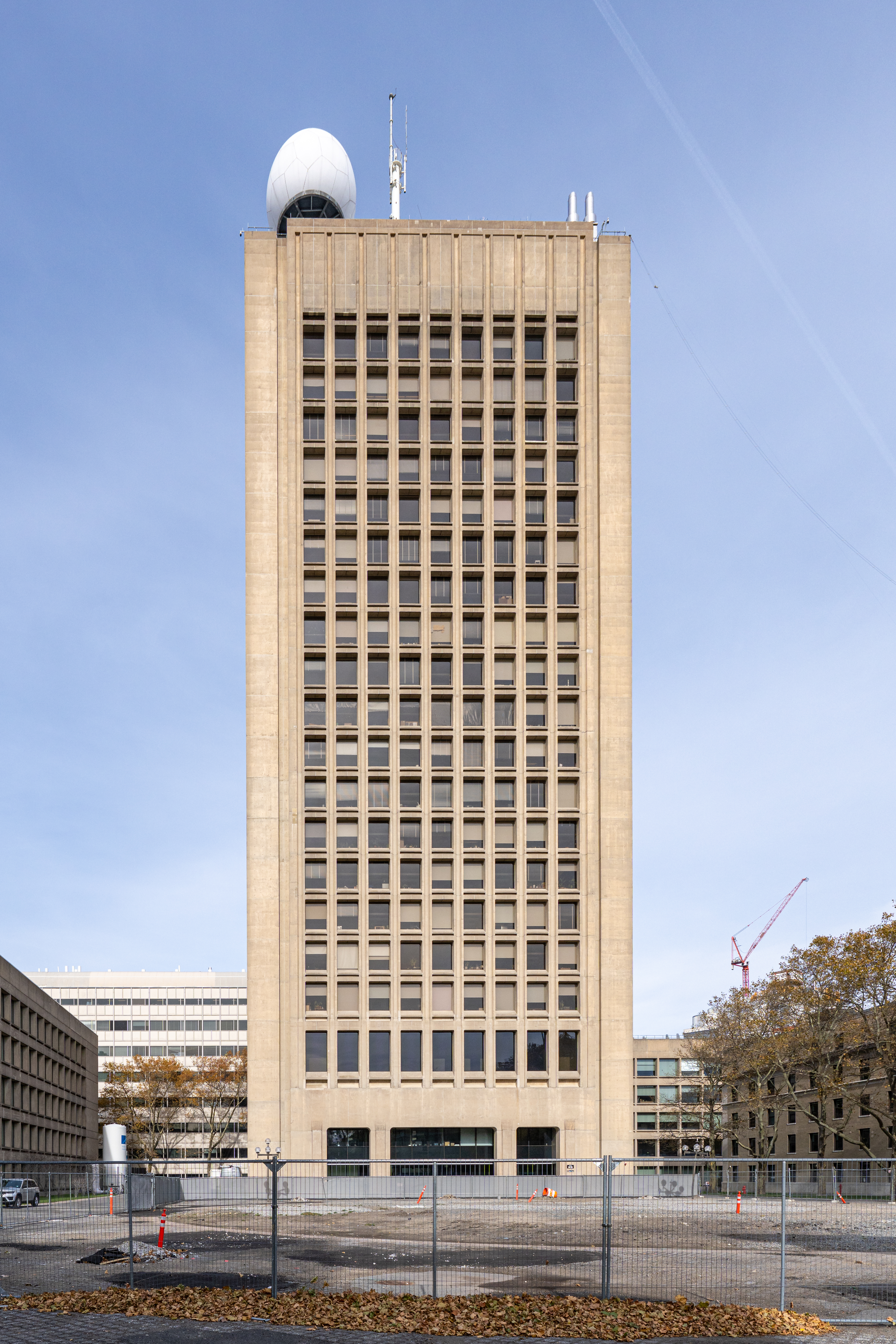
The Green Building

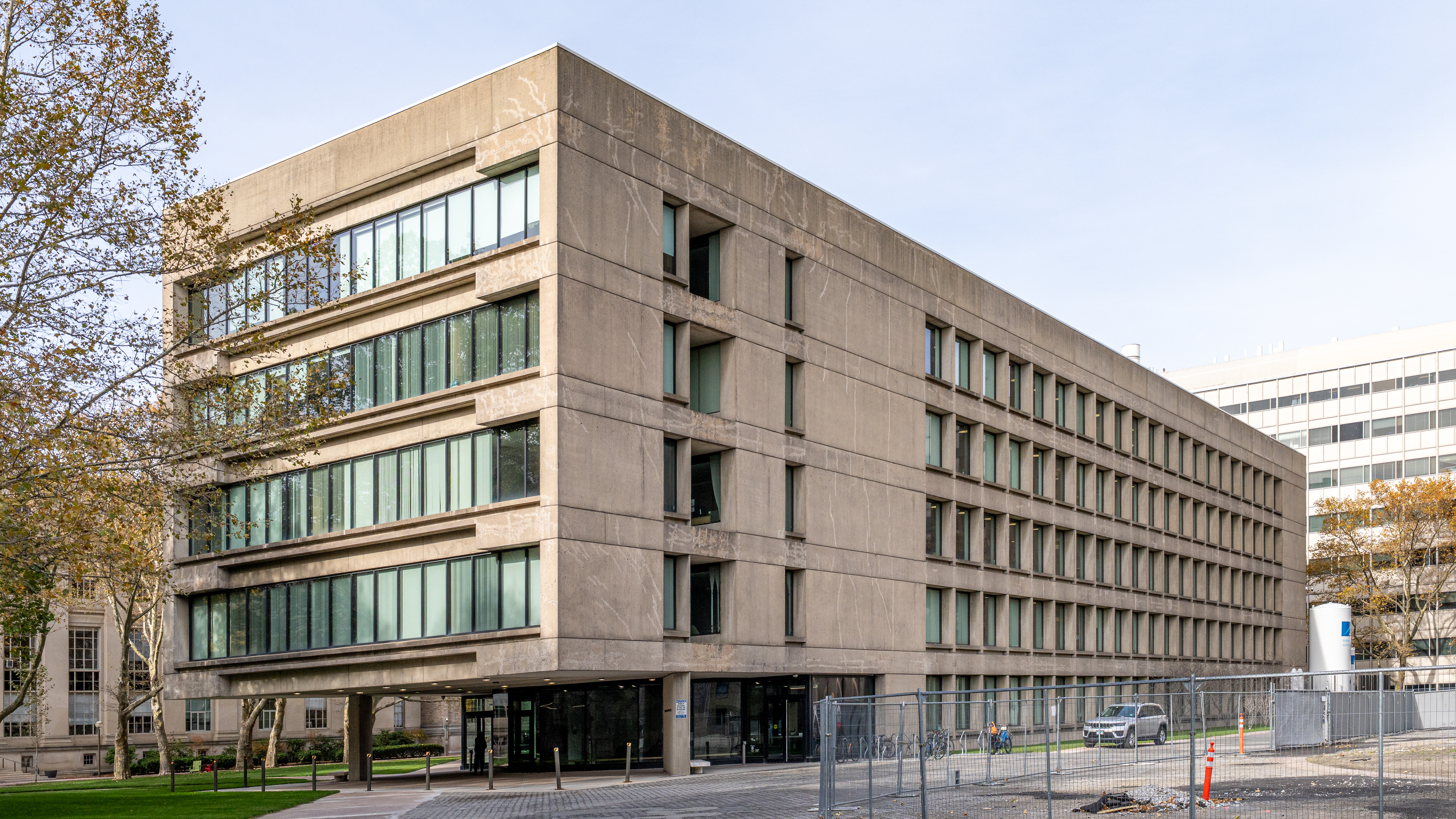
Dreyfus Building

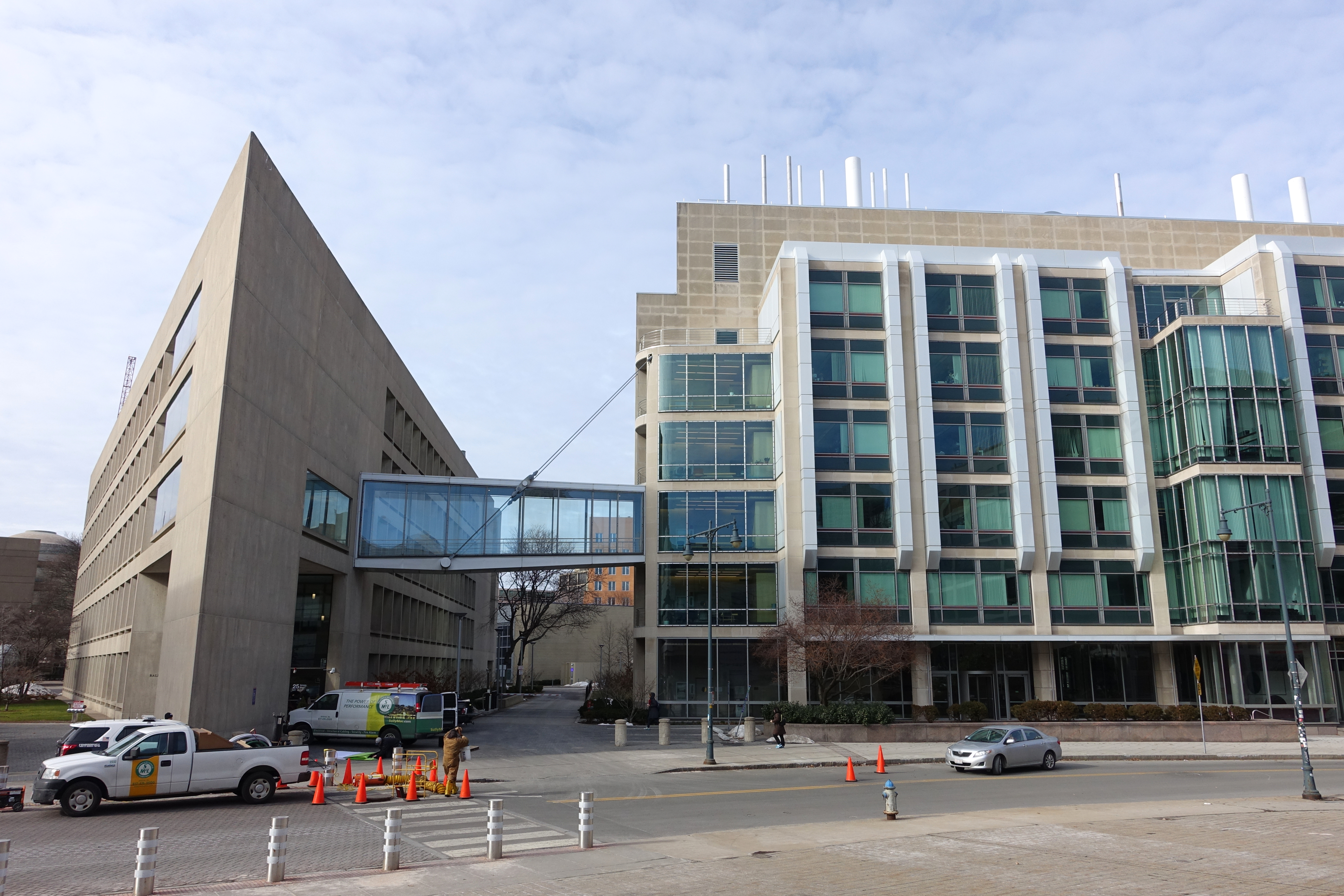
The Landau Building

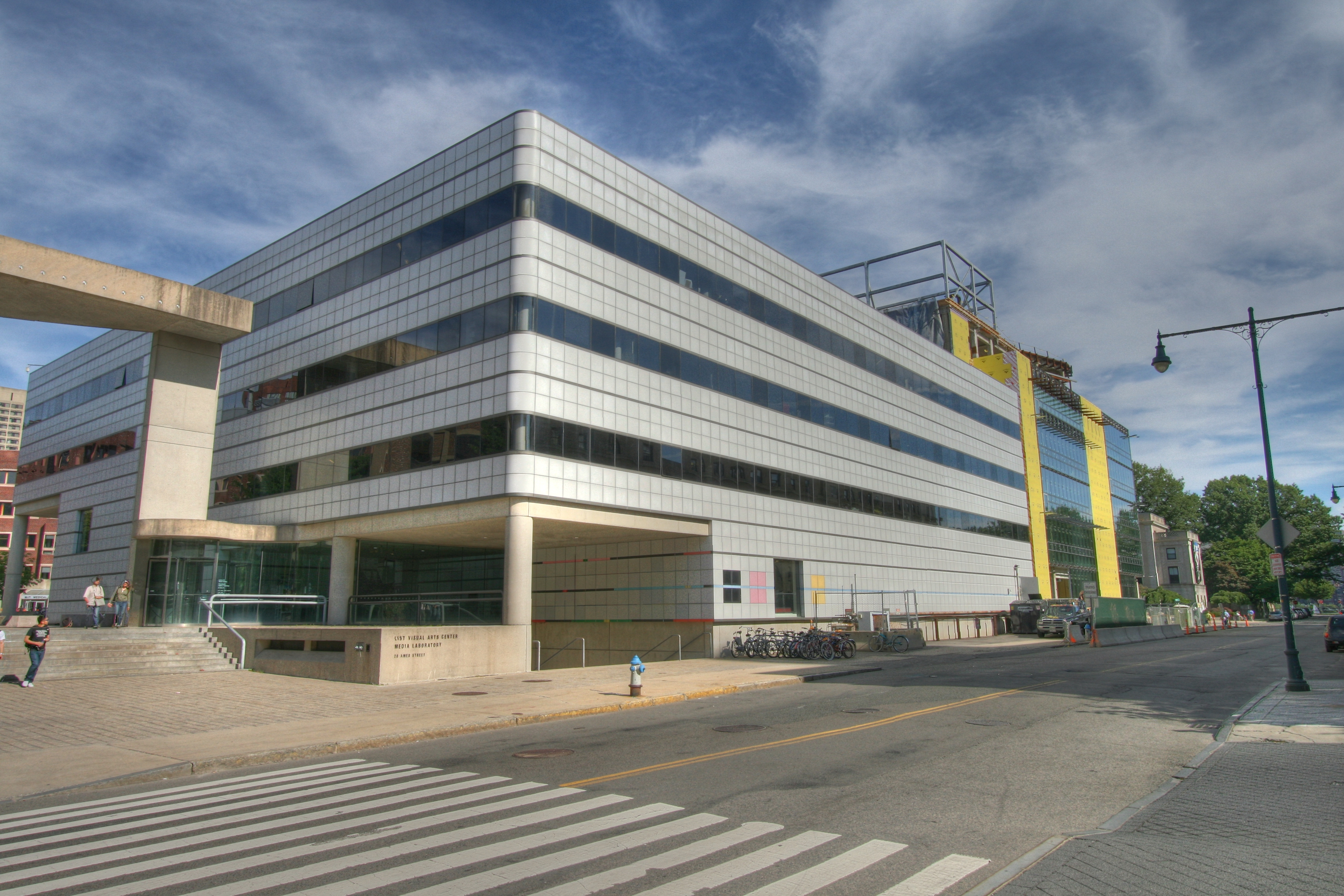
MIT Media Laboratory from Ames St. looking east

=== McDermott Court ===
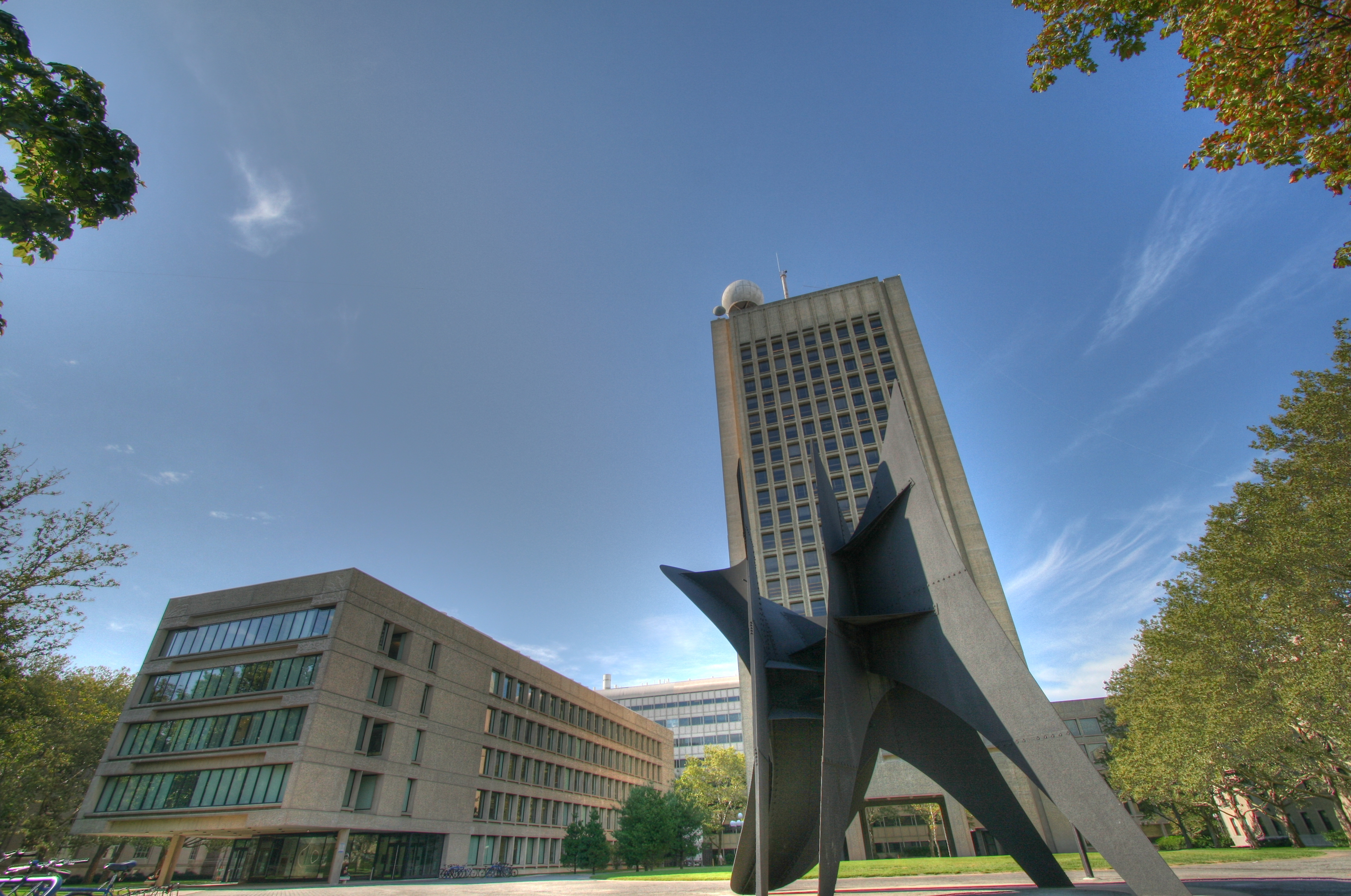
McDermott Court in 2008

McDermott Court is located between the Chemistry, Earth Sciences, the Alumni Houses and the Walker Memorial. Students held at peace rally in the court on September 20, 2001, days after the September 11 attacks. Alexander Calder's La Grande Voile (The Big Sail) (1965) is installed in the court.

=== Dormitories ===
From MIT Housing Chronology

- 1960: Burton-Conner Dining Room
- 1968: Random Hall (NW61) opened. Undergraduate housing.
- 1970: MacGregor House (W61) first occupied in September 1970. Undergraduate housing.
- 1973: Tang Hall (W84) first occupied in 1973. Single graduate housing.
- 1975: New West Campus Houses (W70 – 471–476 Memorial Drive) completed and first occupied in 1975. Undergraduate housing includes Spanish, German, and French Houses.
- 1981: 500 Memorial Drive (W71) Next House completed and first occupied in August 1981. Undergraduate housing.
- 2002: Simmons Hall
- 2021: New Vassar Street Residence Hall (W46) and Graduate Tower at Site 4 (E37)

=== Tang Hall (1973) ===
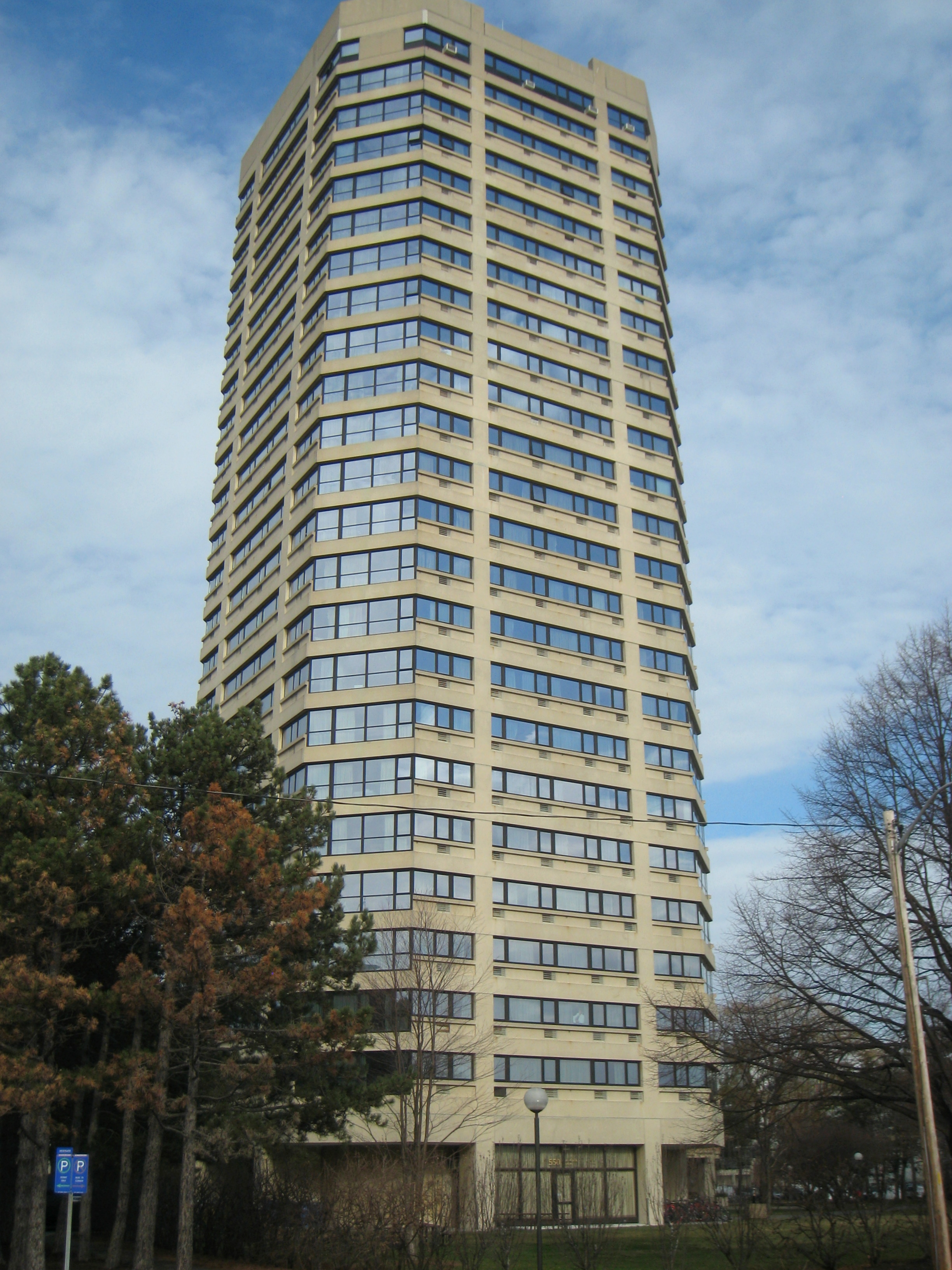
Tang Hall

Tang Hall (W84) is organized into small apartment suites on each floor, occupied by unmarried graduate students. The building structure is unusual at MIT, in that it is made of modular reinforced concrete structural elements, prefabricated off-site. On the campus, this method has usually been reserved for free-standing parking garage structures.

=== Whitaker College (1982) ===
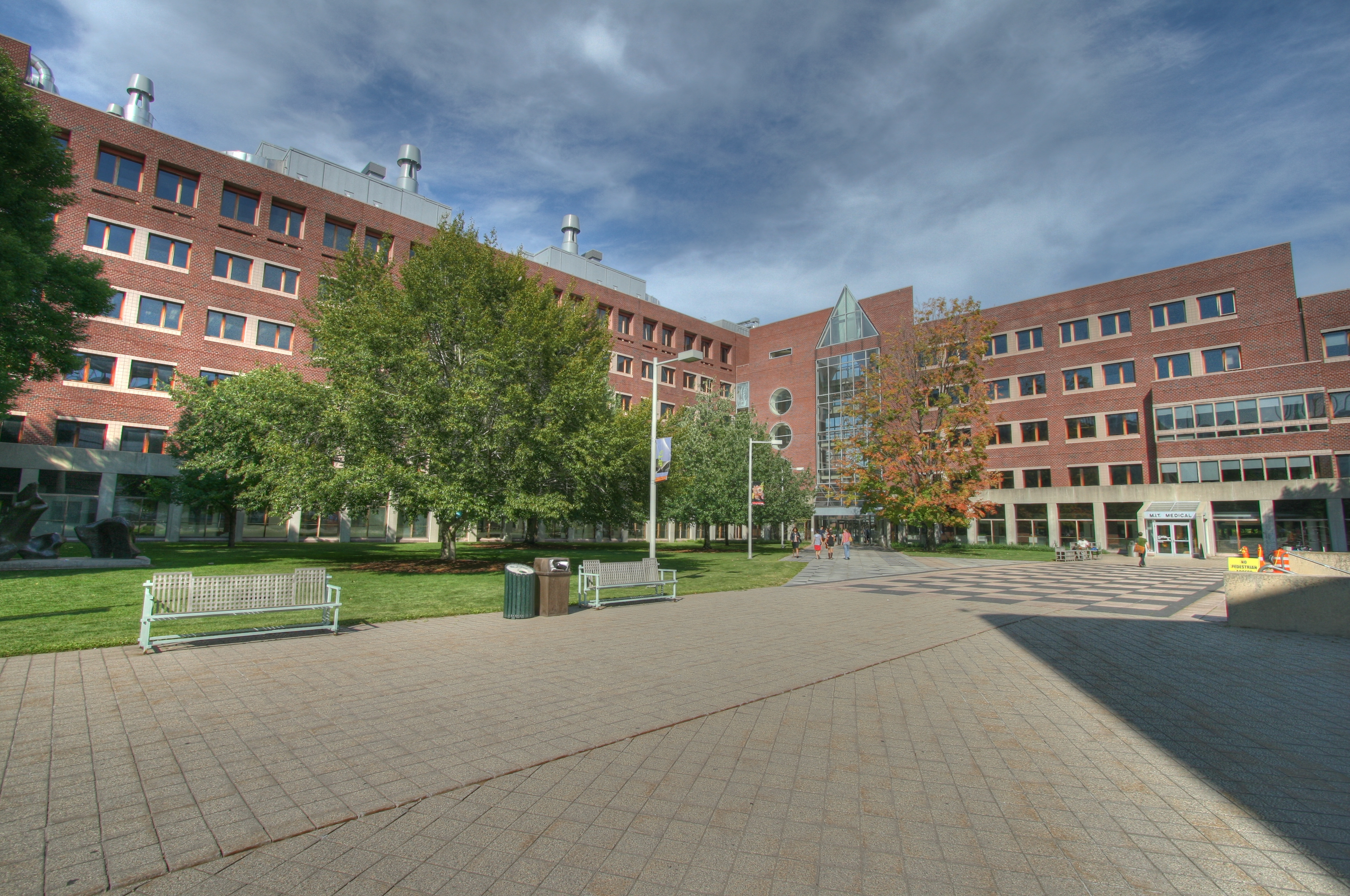
Whitaker College

Whitaker College (Building E25) houses the College of Health Sciences and Technology as well as MIT Medical.

=== Howard W. Johnson Athletic Center (1981) ===
The Howard W. Johnson Athletic Center, named for MIT's 12th president, is located at the west end of the interconnected DAPER Complex, immediately adjacent to the Zesiger Center. The entire complex is often referred to as the Z-Center, with Johnson simply referring to one section of the complex. The Johnson Center houses MIT's varsity fencing, ice hockey, tennis, and track & field teams.

The first floor includes a seasonal ice rink, team locker-room and equipment facilities, and athletic trainers' offices and workspace. The ice rink doubles, in the off-season, as an arena which hosts, among other events, the Career Fair and the annual Spring Weekend Concert. The second floor connects to the Zesiger Center's DAPER offices and pool gallery. The third floor consists of an indoor track and field space, including a small weights area, which often must be shared by MIT's spring athletic teams early in the season, as the Cambridge weather tends to be too cold and/or snowy to practice outside. During finals week, the (ice-free) ice rink and indoor track are utilized to administer final exams for large classes requiring the ample space.

== Evolving Campus (1990–present) ==
A major building effort has been underway for several years in the wake of a $2 billion development campaign. For these commissions, MIT brought in leading architects (many of which had no prior connection to MIT) to propose dramatic new buildings to contrast the earlier, more "mundane" buildings. The new buildings have created a good deal of debate, particularly in a city like Boston, which is not known for its contemporary architecture. Critics have both hailed and assailed the prominence of "starchitecture" on campus.

=== Koch Biology Building (1994) ===
The Koch Biology Building (also Building 68) is a building named after David H. Koch who donated $100 million to MIT for cancer research. It houses research laboratories from the Department of Biology and has 8 floors. The building was completed in 1994 and is designed by Goody Clancy & Associates.

=== Central Utilities Plant (1995) ===
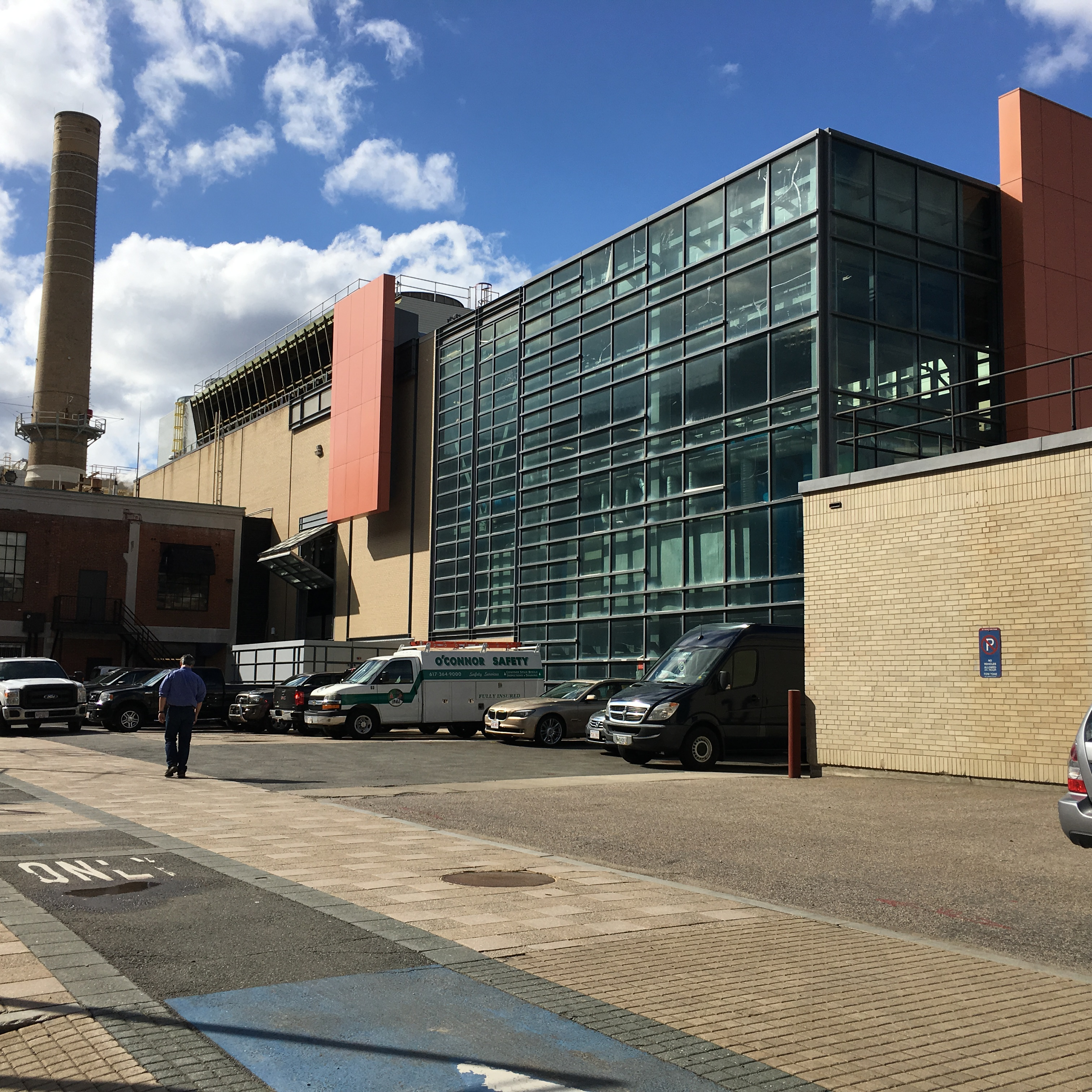
William R. Dickson Cogeneration Facility

Much of the energy for the MIT campus comes from a Central Utilities Plant (Building 42). Located between Albany and Vassar Streets, this cogeneration facility includes a 21 megawatt ABB GT10A Combustion Turbine Generator and a heat recovery system and produces electricity, steam heat, and chilled water for more than 100 campus buildings. MIT plans to replace the existing turbine, which is nearing the end of its useful life, with two new 22 megawatt units by 2020. Since the cogeneration plant came on line in 1995, MIT estimates it has used one third less fuel than it would have using conventional sources for electricity and steam. The plant is also capable of powering portions of the campus in an emergency.

=== Zesiger Sports and Fitness Center (2002) ===
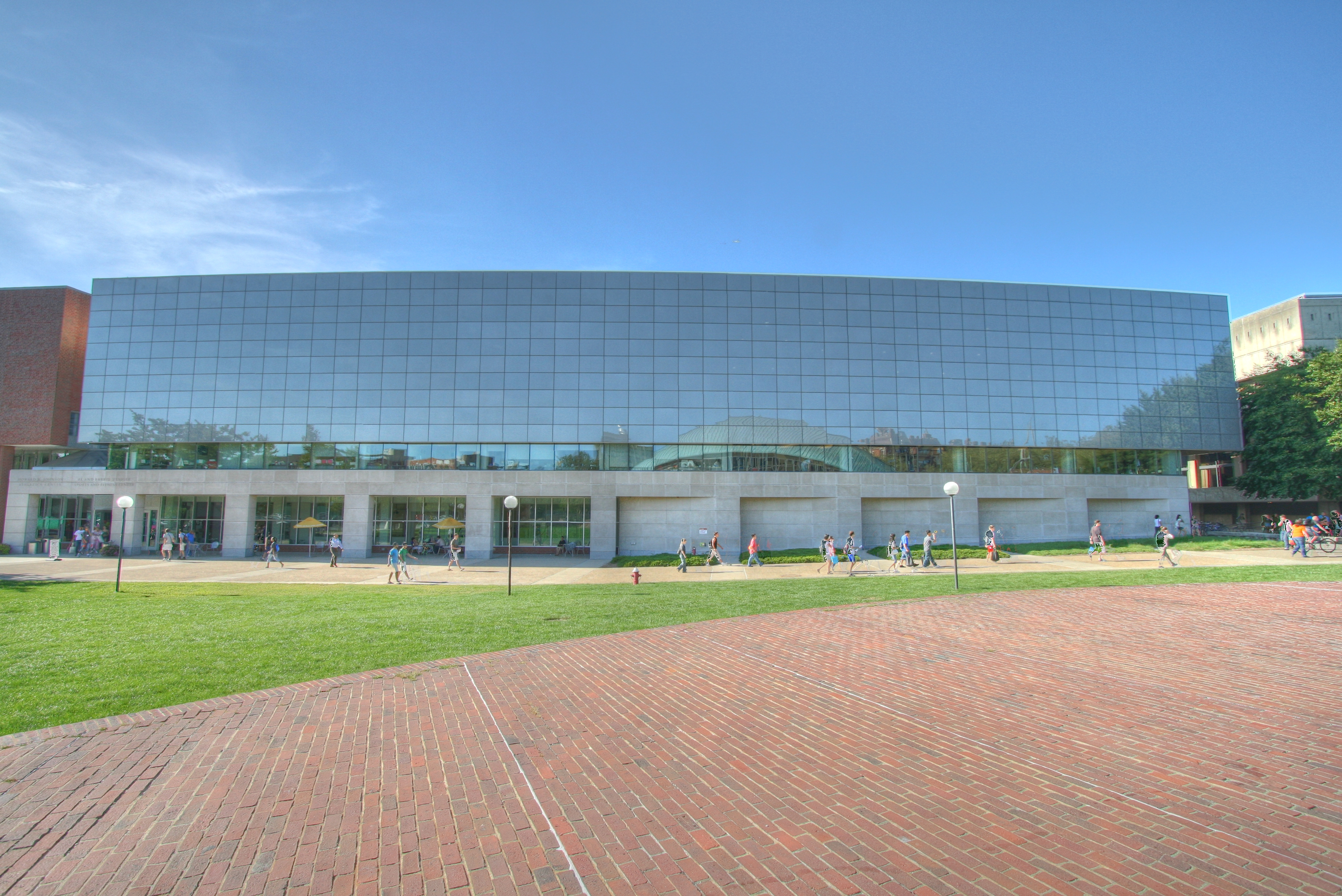
The Zesiger Sports and Fitness Center

The Zesiger Sports and Fitness Center (Z-Center) was designed by Kevin Roche and John Dinkeloo & Associates, (2002). It features an Olympic-class, 50-meter by 25-yard, swimming pool, plus a separate 8-lane, 25-yard teaching pool, two levels of weight and aerobic equipment, the multi-purpose Muckley MAC Court, the Folger, Steinman and Jules squash courts, and offices for DAPER staff. It is the home of MIT's water polo, swimming & diving, and squash teams.

The Zesiger Center is connected to the Johnson Athletic Center, the Rockwell Cage, and the DuPont Athletic Center as part of the Main DAPER Complex. However, the entire complex is often referred to as the Z-Center among the MIT community while Johnson, Rockwell, and DuPont refer to areas within the complex.

=== Simmons Hall (2002) ===
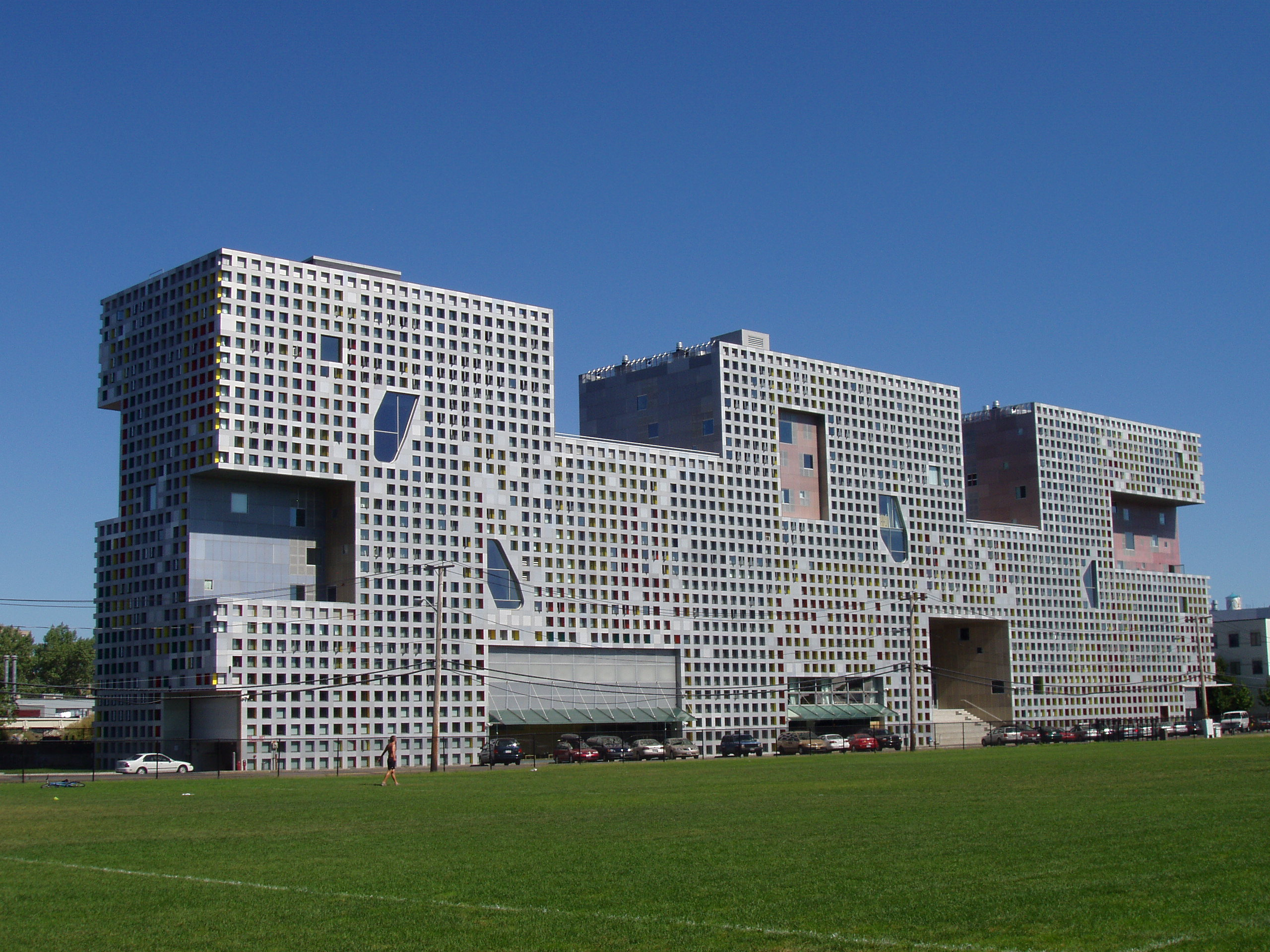
Simmons Hall

After the alcohol-related death of an MIT freshman living in an off-campus fraternity in 1998, the MIT administration settled the resulting lawsuit under the stipulation that all freshmen be required to live on campus. This resulted in a need for beds for 300 freshmen who previously would have lived in off-campus fraternities, sororities, and independent living groups. Steven Holl and Associates were chosen to lead the design for a new "porous" dormitory in 1999. Simmons Hall opened in August 2002 for student occupancy.

Simmons Hall has been nicknamed "The Sponge", because the architect consciously modeled the shape and internal structure on a sea sponge. The building has 350 student rooms, 5,538 2-foot square windows, and is constructed of 291 customized precast, steel-reinforced Perfcon panels.

Simmons Hall, opened in 2002 at MIT and designed by Steven Holl, aimed to foster community through a “porous” structure inspired by a sea sponge. Conceived as a “vertical slice of a city,” it features 350 rooms, each with nine 2-foot windows, and communal spaces like a 125-seat theater and dining hall to encourage interaction. Five Residential Scholars, including figures like Tenzin Priyadarshi, were integrated to enrich student life with cultural and intellectual diversity, creating an open, vibrant environment.

Students saw the design as both inspiring and challenging. The 2006 Inside the Sponge exhibition highlighted their pride in the building’s unique identity as “The Sponge,” with lounges hosting events like film nights that built community. Scholars’ activities, such as Priyadarshi’s meditation sessions, fostered inclusion. However, students noted that the small windows felt confining and the maze-like corridors were confusing, limiting spontaneous encounters. Lounges were often underused due to their less accessible placement, leaving some feeling isolated.

STS scholars view Simmons Hall as an experiment in shaping social behavior. Its flexible design allowed students to personalize spaces, aligning with MIT’s innovative culture, as seen in creative proposals to improve lounges and terraces. Yet, the complex layout posed accessibility issues, particularly for those with mobility needs, and the design couldn’t fully address cultural or socioeconomic divides in MIT’s intense environment. Jeff Roberts, a student involved in the design process, called it “fragmented and isolating,” suggesting limits to its community-building potential.

Simmons Hall was designed to create a dynamic space for some, but its physical and social shortcomings show the challenge of designing for universal belonging.

=== Stata Center (2004) ===
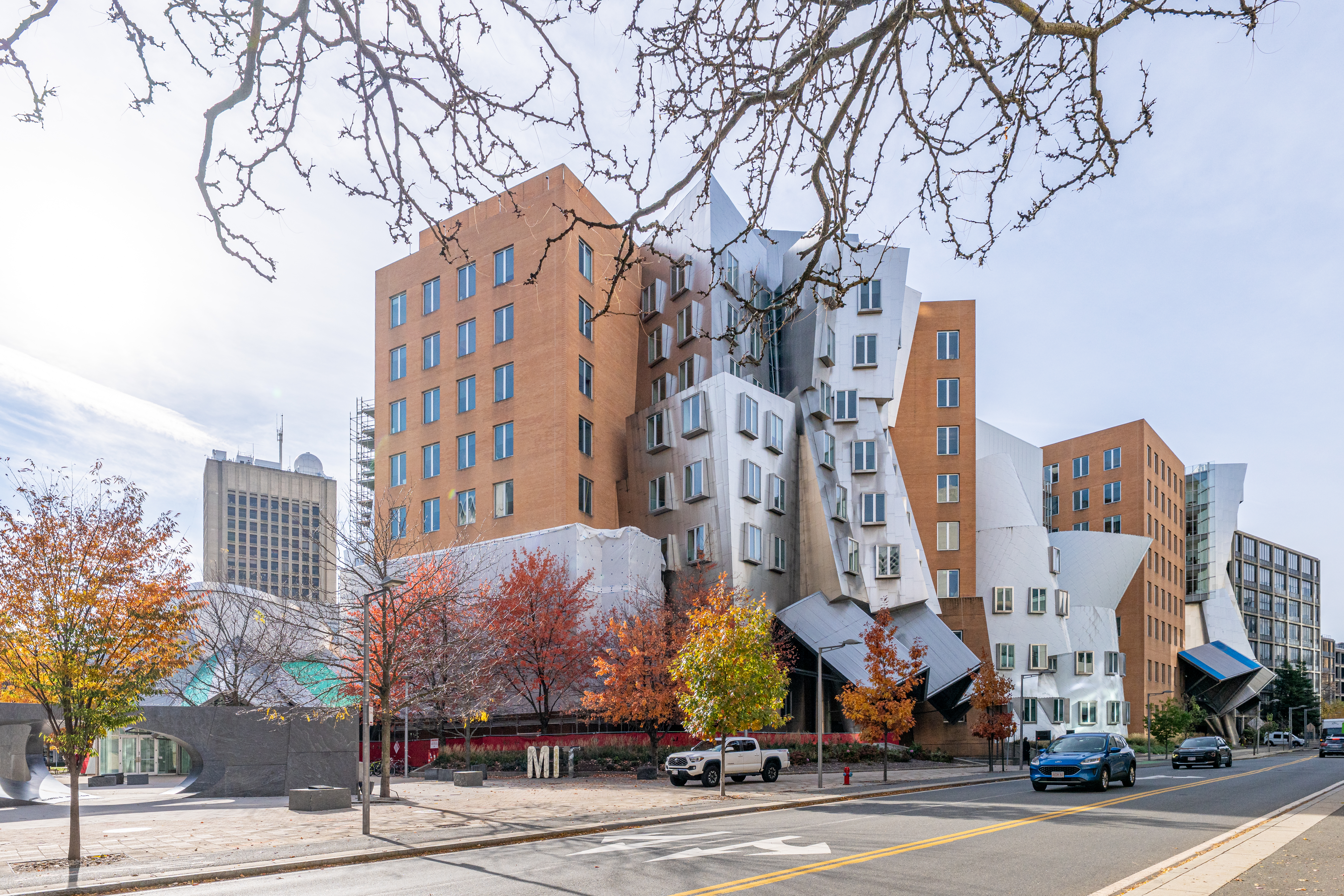
Ray and Maria Stata Center

The architecture of the Ray and Maria Stata Center (Building 32) is some of the most recognizable on MIT's campus. Designed by architect Frank Gehry, the building is built in a Deconstructivist style - it is composed of an eclectic combination of shapes constructed using a range of materials from brick to glass to a variety of architectural metals. The building houses several auditoriums, classrooms, and offices for the Electrical Engineering and Computer Science department (Course 6). In particular, the upper floors house research labs and offices of the Computer Science and Artificial Intelligence Laboratory (CSAIL), the Laboratory for Information and Decision Systems (LIDS), as well as the Department of Linguistics and Philosophy (Course 24). The ground floor of the building offers additional features such as the Forbes Cafe, art installations associated with the MIT Museum, and a campus childcare center; it is also directly connected to the Wang Fitness Center and Alumni Pool (Building 57).

=== Brain and Cognitive Sciences Building (2006) ===
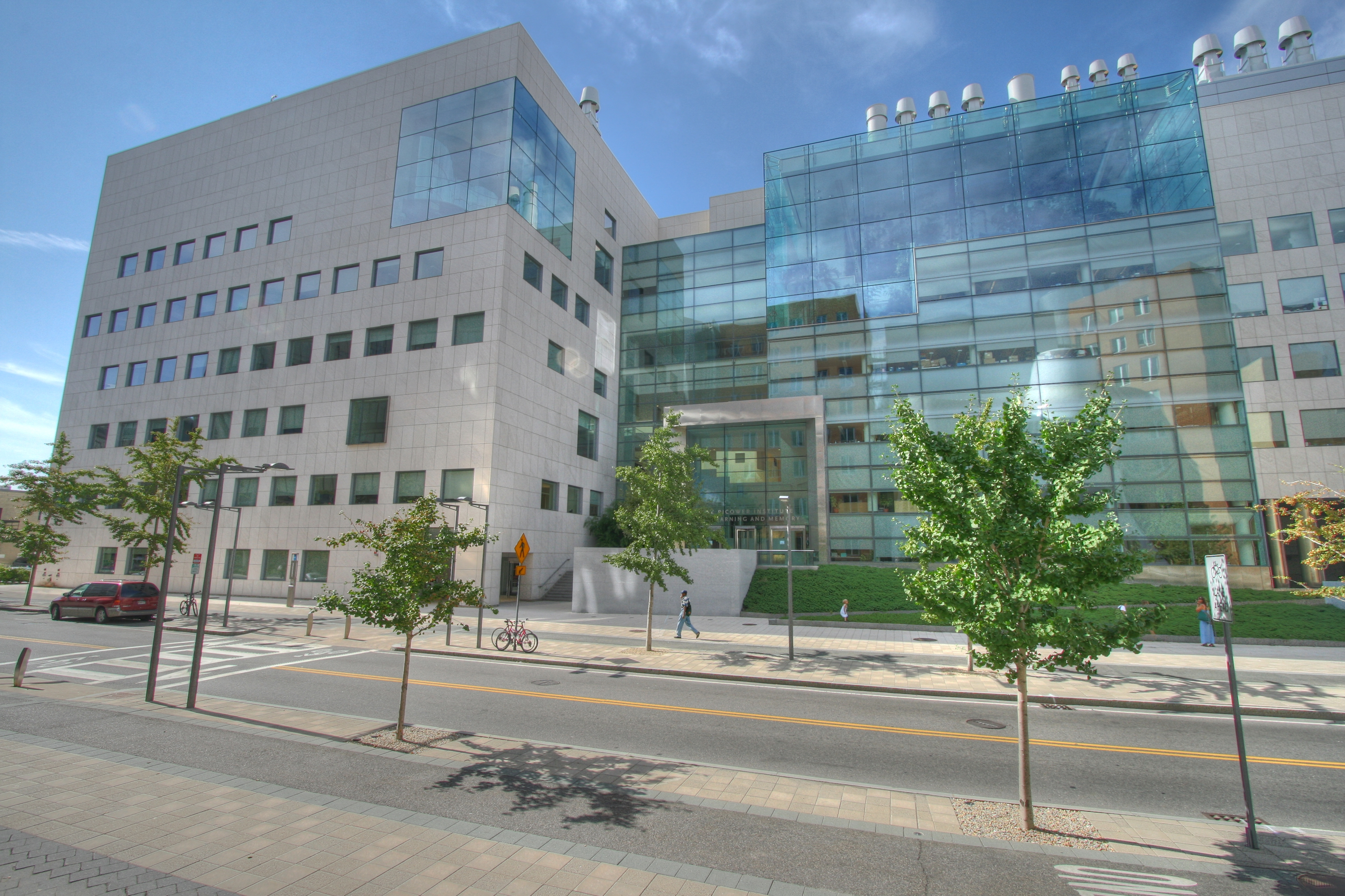
Building 46

Building 46 houses the Picower Institute for Learning and Memory, the Department of Brain and Cognitive Science and the McGovern Institute for Brain Research. It was designed by Charles Correa, Julian Beinart, and Roger Goldstein.

=== Officer Sean Collier Memorial (2015) ===
This large, abstract environmental sculpture is a memorial to MIT Police Officer Sean Collier, who was killed in the line of duty on 18 April 2013 in the aftermath of the Boston Marathon bombings. It was conceived, designed, and constructed within two years of Collier's death, and is located on the site of a small landscaped bed between the Ray and Maria Stata Center and the David H. Koch Institute. The memorial consists of 32 massive granite blocks precision-shaped under computer numerical control, and fitted together into a shallow open domed arch with 5 radial support wings splayed out like fingers of an open hand.

=== Lisa T Su Building (2018, MIT.nano) ===
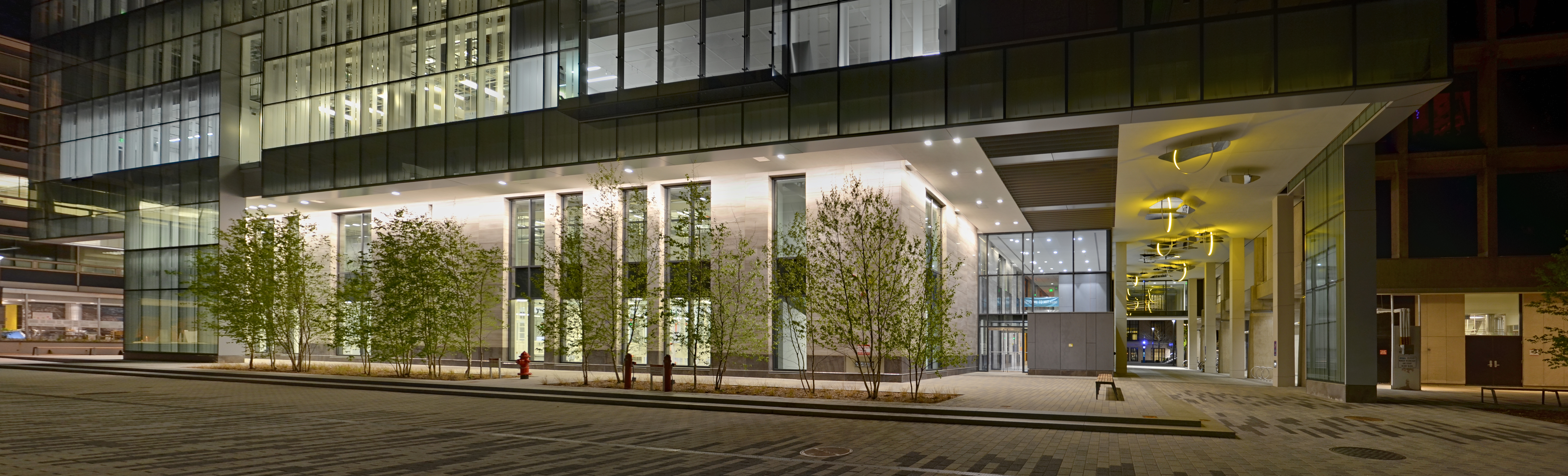
MIT.nano

The new Lisa T Su building, which replaced a previous Building 12, is the home to the MIT.nano facilities intended as a multi-disciplinary research node in nanoscience and nanotechnology. The building contains undergraduate teaching labs used by the Chemistry Department for core curriculum classes, as well as advanced chip fabrication facilities used for semiconductor and nanotechnology research. The central location of the building, plus its administration shared among multiple departments, are intended to ensure equal access to all students and researchers who might benefit from its capabilities.

Much of the building is taken up with environmental control machinery, hazardous chemical safety, and special facilities to support the laboratory work. Special ventilation requirements up to 260 air changes per hour, humidity control, temperature stability, and precision air filtering imply high energy consumption; nevertheless, extensive mitigation and conservation measures have earned the building its LEED Platinum designation.

The building incorporates a small nano-art gallery along a glassed-in corridor at the periphery of the first floor. A permanent installation there is One.MIT, a mosaic image depicting the MIT Great Dome, formed by etching more than 270,000 names on a 6-inch-diameter silicon wafer. The names of all the people known to be associated with MIT from its founding (1861) to 2018 were incorporated into the etched image, as well as an enlarged 6-foot (1.8 m) image on the wall nearby. An accompanying website has been created to aid in locating individual names within the mosaic images. As of 2020, more than 320,000 names have been identified for an updated online version of the database.

=== Hockfield Court ===
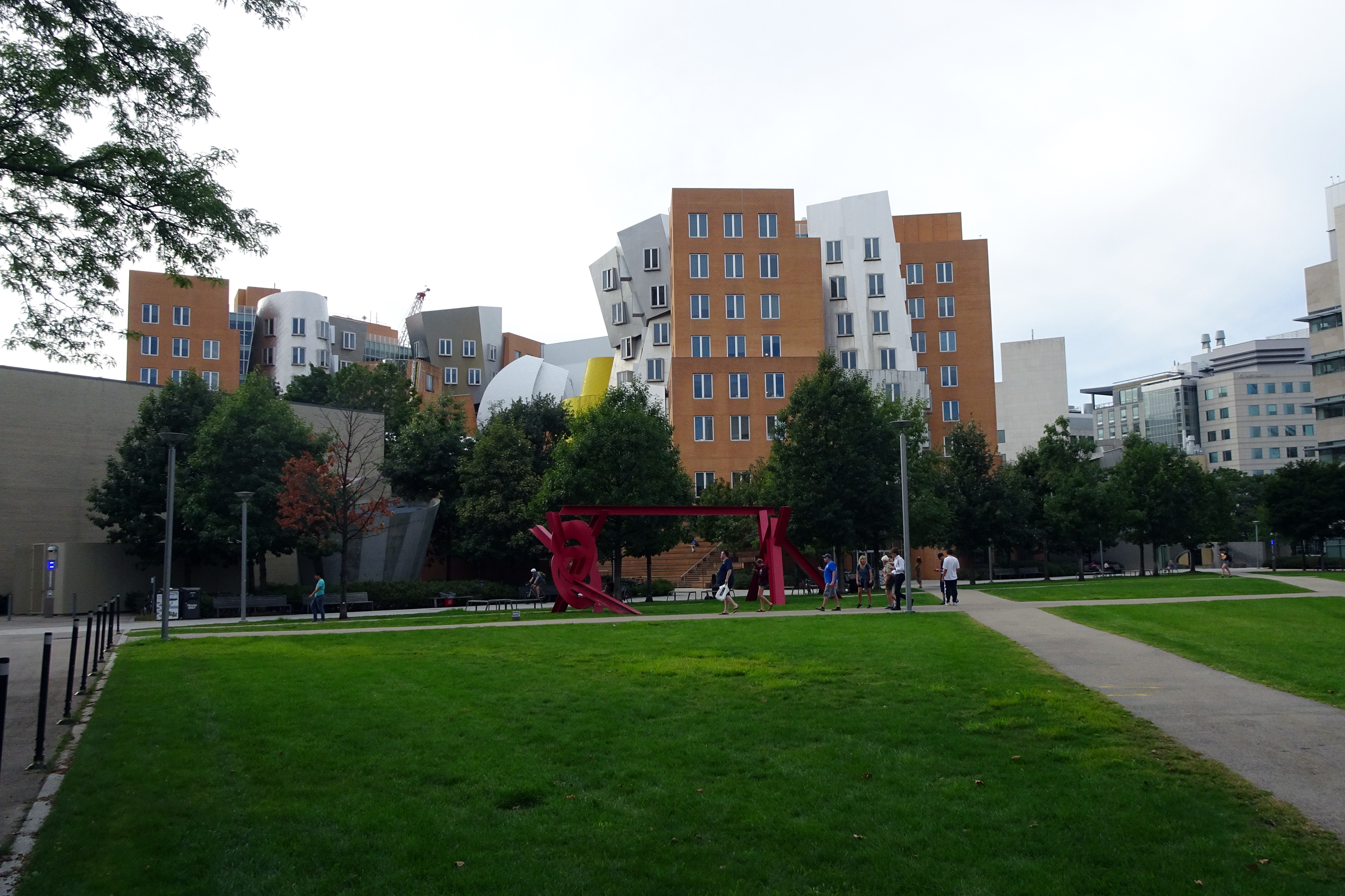
Hockfield Court in 2018

In 2019, the North Court was renamed Hockfield Court after MIT's 16th President Susan Hockfield. Mark Di Suvero's Aesop's Fables, II (2005) is installed in the court.

=== Metropolitan Storage Warehouse ===
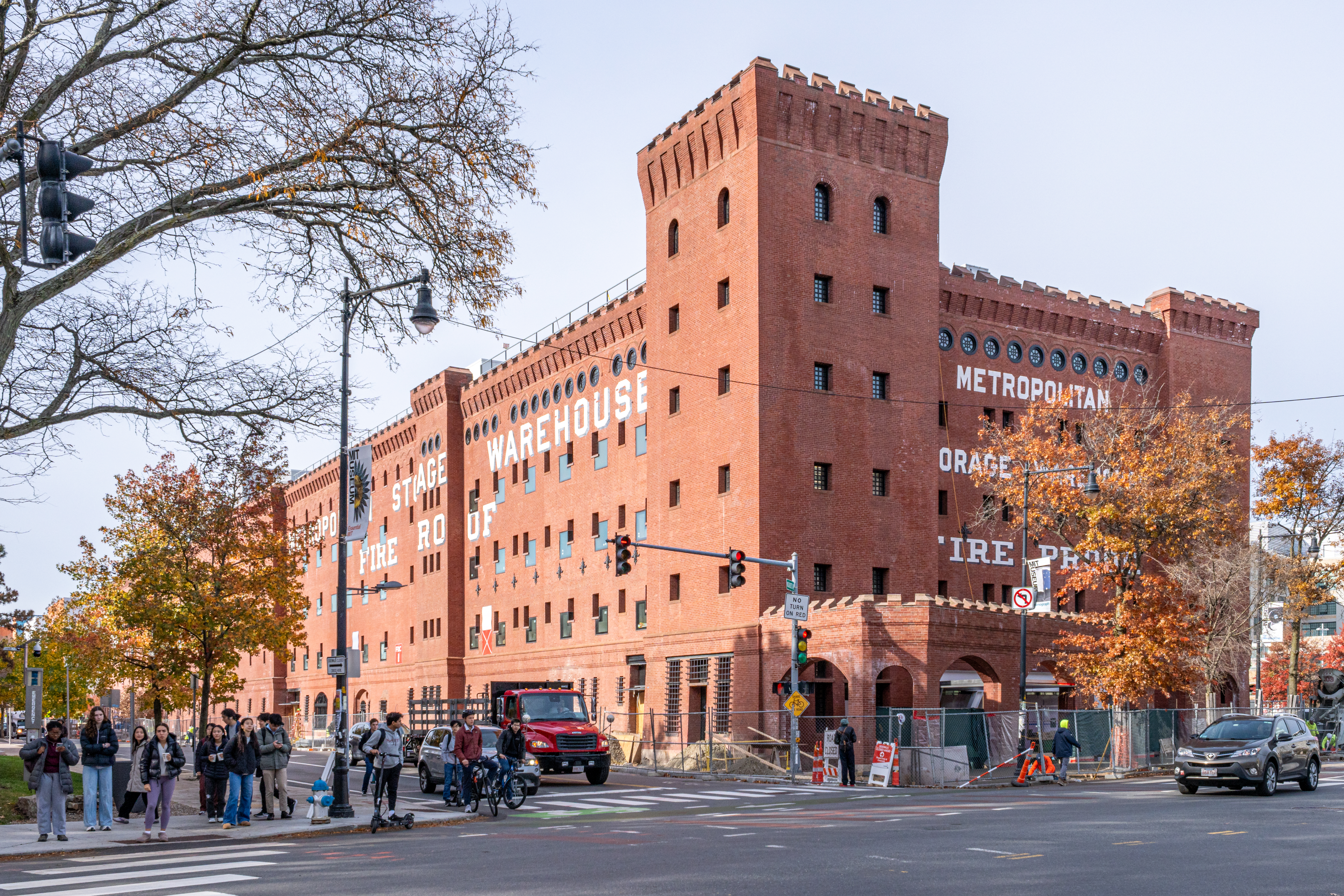
This lettering on Building W41 provides an unintentional visual pun when seen from a particular vantage point.

Building W41, 134 Massachusetts Avenue, was built in 1895 and extended in 1911. Until 2015 it was the home of the Metropolitan Storage Warehouse, used to store furniture, household and office items, and archives. MIT has announced plans to convert it for use by the School of Architecture and Planning. (Note: https://news.mit.edu/2018/metropolitan-storage-warehouse-school-architecture-planning-0614) (Note: https://www.cambridgeday.com/2015/08/13/mit-shutting-down-metropolitan-storage-after-121-years-to-revamp-for-student-uses/)

== Historical retrospective ==
MIT’s architecture reflects the style changes through the years. Starting with neoclassicism (1861); which is a movement marked by the desire to return to the sources of art, particularly in architecture, and characterized by the imitation of ancient Greek and Roman buildings. This symbolizes scientific rigor, the erection of buildings based on calculations like those used to make the Vitruvian Man, but also the order and heritage of classical knowledge, a concept well implemented in sciences. Maclaurin Buildings by William Welles Bosworth, 1916.

Following with the modern era (1940-1960), emphasizing fundamental research and the key role in military advances which was primordial at that time. This current evokes the change from rural to urban style in a context of technical, social and cultural changes related to the industrial revolution. Consisting of clean, functional lines that symbolize efficiency, technicality and rationality this reflects the idea of a laboratory-campus serving the state and on-point technologies. Baker House by Alvar Aalto, 1949.

The brutalist period came afterwards (1960-1980), distinguished in particular by the repetition of certain elements such as windows, by the absence of ornaments and the raw character of the concrete, it was very popular in Eastern Europe. It invokes a more institutionalized vision of science. It also refers to a tension between technological power and humanism, between science and society. At that time, student protests began and the role of the MIT with military progress was criticised. Cecil and Ida Green Building, also called the Green Building or Building 54 by I. M. Pei and Araldo Cossutta, 1964.

Ending with deconstructivism and innovation (2000-now), a postmodern architectural movement which gives the impression of the fragmentation of constructed buildings and commonly characterised by an absence of obvious harmony, continuity, or symmetry. Appearing at a time where the goal was to promote interdisciplinary thinking, innovation and the resolution of worldwide challenges. These open and complex buildings symbolize creativity chaos, doubt and the breaking of disciplinary boundaries. MIT became a cohabitation site where science meets creativity. Ray and Maria Stata Center by Frank Gehry, 2004.

The architecture and layout of a scientific campus are deeply influenced by the prevailing scientific and institutional priorities. When science is oriented toward specific themes — such as industrial development, agriculture, or education — the design and placement of laboratories often reflect these goals by situating them near related facilities or student spaces. Conversely, when the emphasis is on intellectual concentration and methodological rigor, laboratories may be positioned on the periphery of campus, in more closed-off or inward-focused structures that support focused routines and individual research. In contrast, to encourage student engagement, knowledge transmission, and interdisciplinary collaboration, laboratories are often placed at the center of campus life, designed to be open and accessible, fostering interaction, flexibility, and synergy; the Stata Center by Frank Gehry would be a good example. Bates Research and Engineering Center, closed and peripheral laboratory.

== User perception and student experience ==
Members of the MIT community have shared many different opinions about the campus’s architecture. While some buildings are appreciated for their originality and strong visual identity, others are often described as confusing or uncomfortable to use.

Simmons Hall (2002), for example, was designed by Steven Holl to look like a sponge, with thousands of small windows and colorful spaces. Although the building has received praise from architects, many students have found it hard to live in. Complaints include poor airflow, narrow hallways, and a layout that makes it difficult to find one’s way. These critiques reflect not just practical concerns, but also the lived experience of its inhabitants: how the physical environment shapes daily routines, comfort, and orientation. From a sociological perspective, buildings like Simmons Hall can influence feelings of alienation or disconnection when spatial complexity overwhelms intuitive navigation or personal agency. This aligns with broader theories in environmental psychology and the sociology of space, which emphasize how users’ perception and interaction with architectural forms affect their well-being and sense of place.

A similar situation exists with the Stata Center (2004), designed by Frank Gehry. Its unusual shapes and tilted walls make the building stand out, but they also make some offices hard to use and some spaces difficult to navigate. In 2007, MIT even filed a lawsuit against Gehry’s firm over problems with the building’s construction.

According to historian Thomas Hughes, these buildings reflect MIT’s desire to appear creative and forward-thinking, even if that means accepting buildings that are less practical. In this view, campus architecture is not only about function, but also about showing what kind of institution MIT wants to be.

Other studies have looked at how these buildings affect the people who use them. Researcher Angela Sun argues that campus architecture materially expresses institutional identity, influencing how members of the community perceive themselves and are perceived by others. Her reflections on buildings as carriers of social meaning resonate with the way alternative dorms like Senior House have been seen as enabling freer self-expression and stronger communities.

The layout of buildings also affects how people work together. A 2022 study by Basu, Sevtsuk, and others showed that people who sit near each other are more likely to talk and collaborate. This supports earlier comments by architect Carl Solander, who compared Building 20, a plain and flexible building, to the more rigid and visually complex Stata Center. He argued that Building 20 made spontaneous teamwork easier, while Stata’s fixed walls and scattered spaces sometimes got in the way.

Overall, the way buildings are designed at MIT plays a role not just in how they look or function, but in how people live, study, and work together on campus.

== Landscaping ==
As MIT's riverfront site was a marshland filled-in by dredging from the bottom of the Charles, it was largely free from either natural flora or previous occupants. In 1892, the Cambridge Park Commission had commissioned Frederick Law Olmsted to lay out a picturesque driveway and park along the Charles River that would feature tree-lined promenades and a central mall. Bosworth's plan would integrate this Memorial Drive (Cambridge) into the campus by using courtyards enclosed and overlooked by the academic buildings.

Killian (née Great) Court, the ceremonial main entrance, was originally planned by Mabel Keyes Babcock '08 to be a French-style gravel-covered court centered on a large statue of Minerva. However, as automobile and trolley traffic along Massachusetts Avenue made the western buildings the de facto entrance to MIT, the Great Court was replaced by "street-edge plantings of low privet hedges, a line of oak trees, lawns and base plantings to create a visual transition from the ground level over the English basement to the first floor of the new buildings." The New England Hurricane of 1938 and Dutch Elm Disease required that many of the original trees in Killian be replaced by pin oaks.

Temporary buildings constructed during and immediately after World War II occupied many vacant lots around MIT, but the 1960 Campus Master Plan included Hideo Sasaki as a landscape architect. The Landscape Master Plan called for "tree-lined and landscaped streets and pathways; well-defined open spaces, each reflecting the designs and functions of the buildings in each campus sector; and a variety of tree species to safeguard the campus against the blights that strike monocultures."

== Artwork ==
The Massachusetts Institute of Technology has hundreds of sculptures and other art-related publicly viewable installations scattered across its campus. The MIT art collection includes major works by Pablo Picasso, Henry Moore, Alexander Calder (La Grande Voile (The Big Sail)), Jacques Lipchitz, Dan Flavin, Dan Graham, Sarah Sze, Tony Smith, Theodore Roszak, Harry Bertoia, Jean-Robert Ipousteguy, Auguste Rodin, Anish Kapoor, Mark di Suvero, Louise Nevelson, Sol LeWitt, Frank Stella, Cai Guo-Qiang, and others. Many smaller works of art are visible in offices and hallways, and even residences, under the Student Loan Art Program. The MIT List Visual Arts Center oversees the more than 1,500 works catalogued in the MIT Permanent Art Collection, which can be browsed online.

A self-guided walking tour map of major on-campus art is available from MIT information desks or online, and live guided tours are offered sometimes to the general public. For a number of recent "Public Art Commissions on the MIT Campus", a brochure can be downloaded describing the artwork in detail.

In May 2011, the general public was invited to a weekend FAST (Festival of Art, Science, and Technology) tour of temporary art installations, as part of the MIT 150 celebration of the 150th anniversary of MIT's founding charter. The event was well-attended and popular, inviting the possibility of more such events in the future.

Although not part of the MIT campus, the nearby MBTA subway stop at Kendall Station is the site of the three-piece Kendall Band. This artwork is an interactive sound sculpture which was designed and built by Paul Matisse, grandson of French artist Henri Matisse, and stepson of surrealist artist Marcel Duchamp. The sound sculpture proved so popular that it was frequently worn out or broken, disappointing visitors. In 2010, it was adopted by the "Kendall Band Preservation Society", a group of MIT students and staff who have redesigned and rebuilt some of the broken mechanisms (with the approval of the artist) that made the sculpture operate.

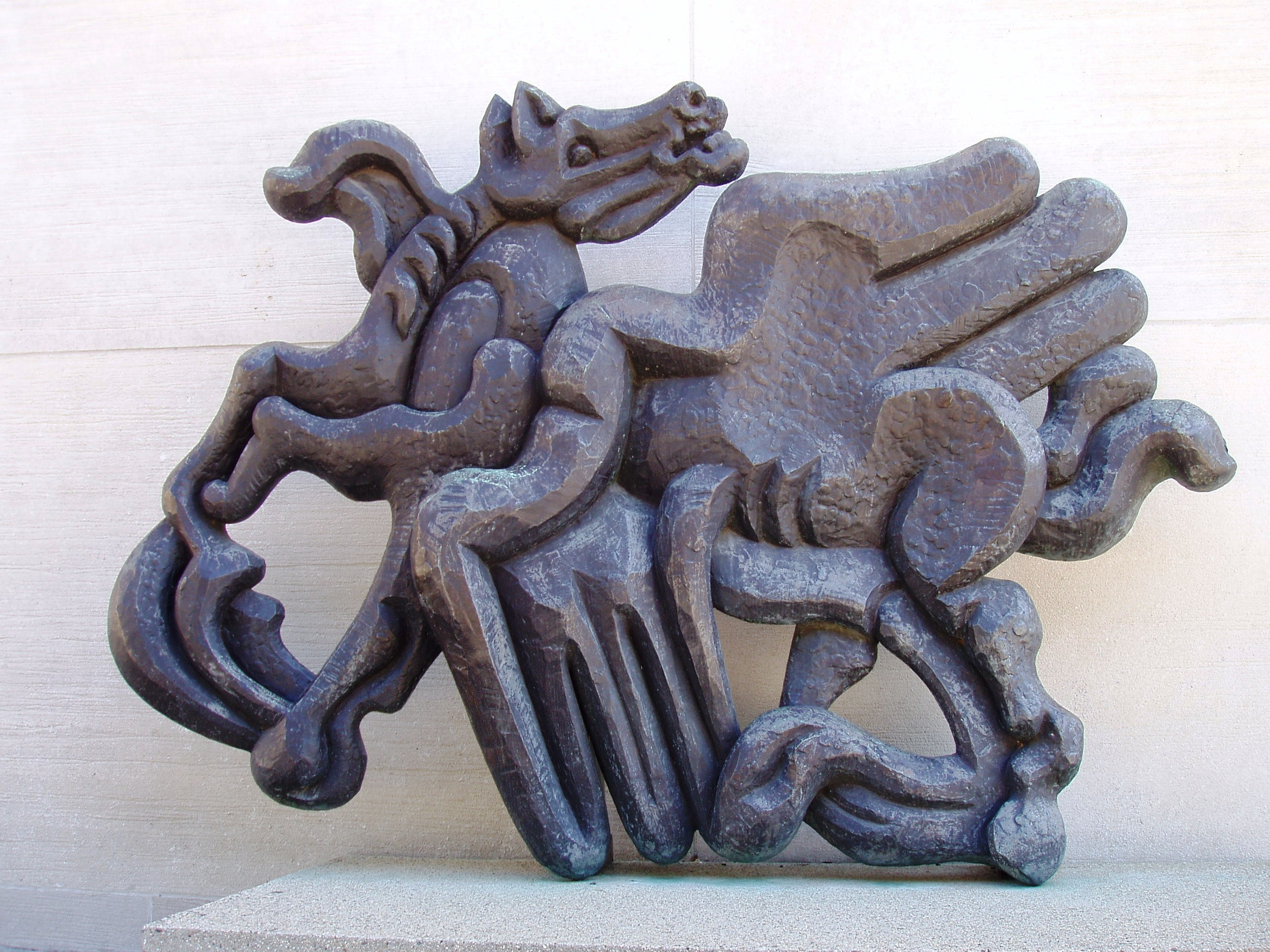
Birth of the Muses (1944-1950) by Jacques Lipchitz

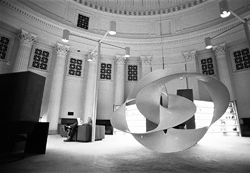
Mobius strip sculpture in the Barker Engineering Library

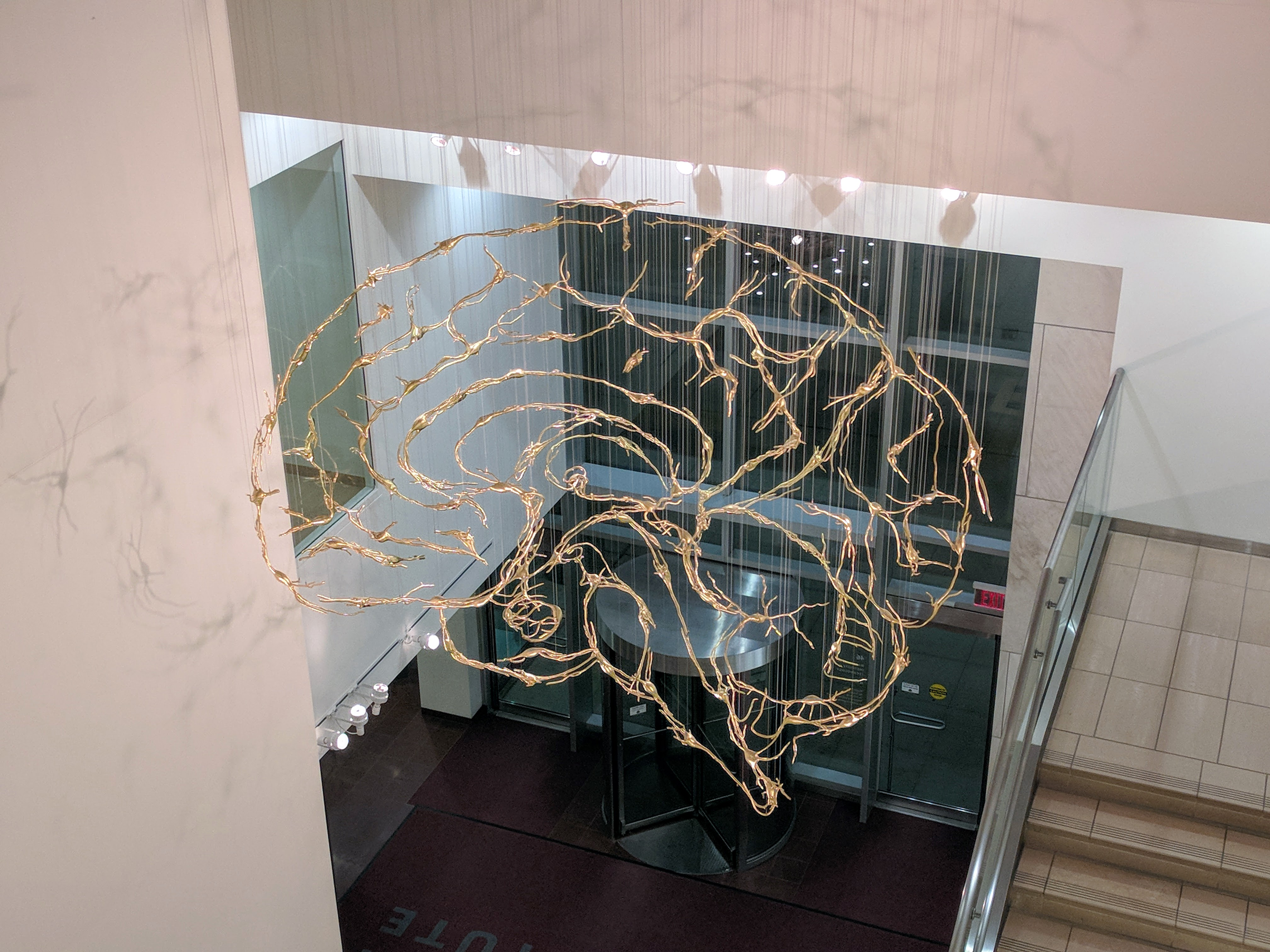
Schwerpunkt (2016) by Ralph Helmick

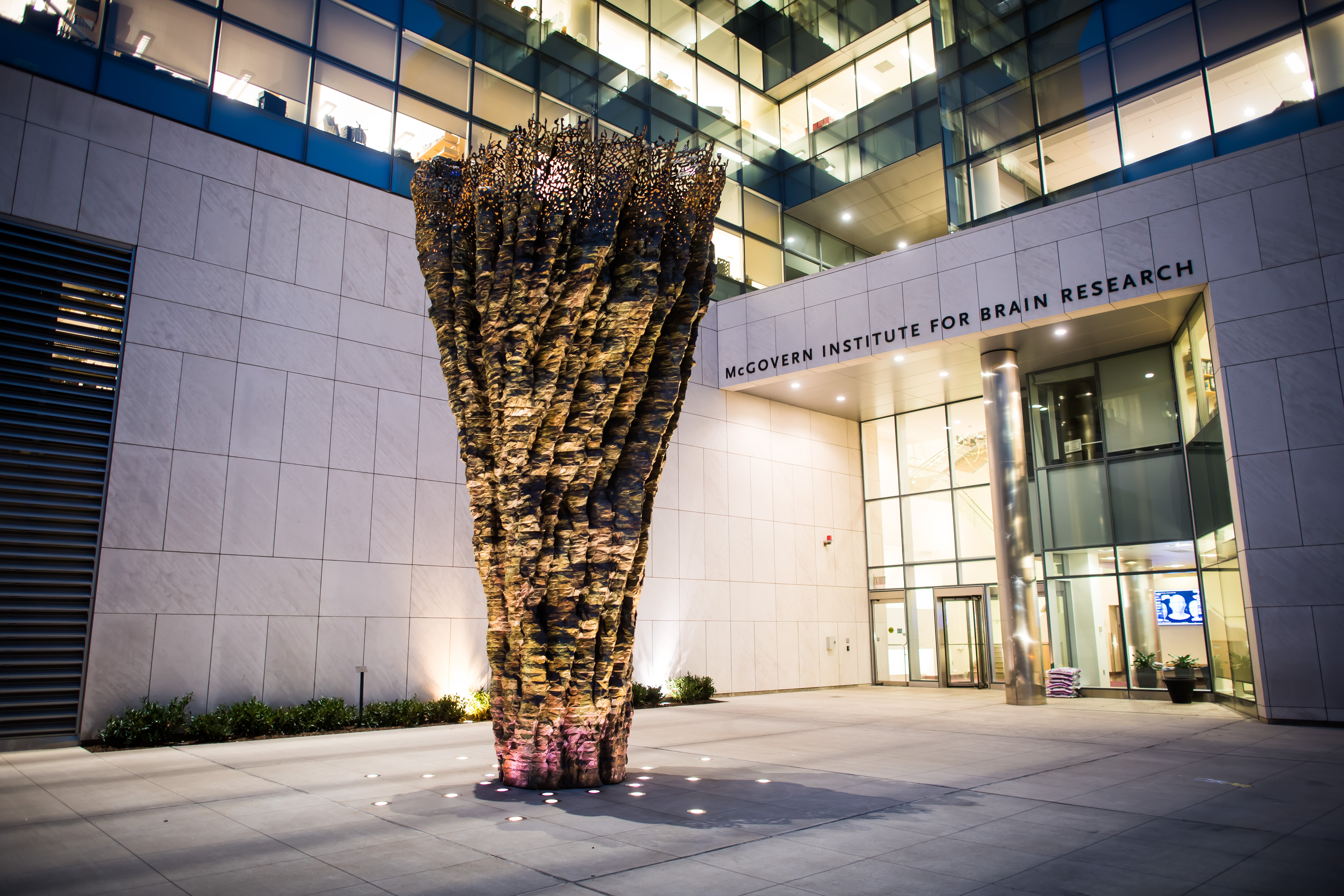
SCIENTIA (2016) by Ursula von Rydingsvard

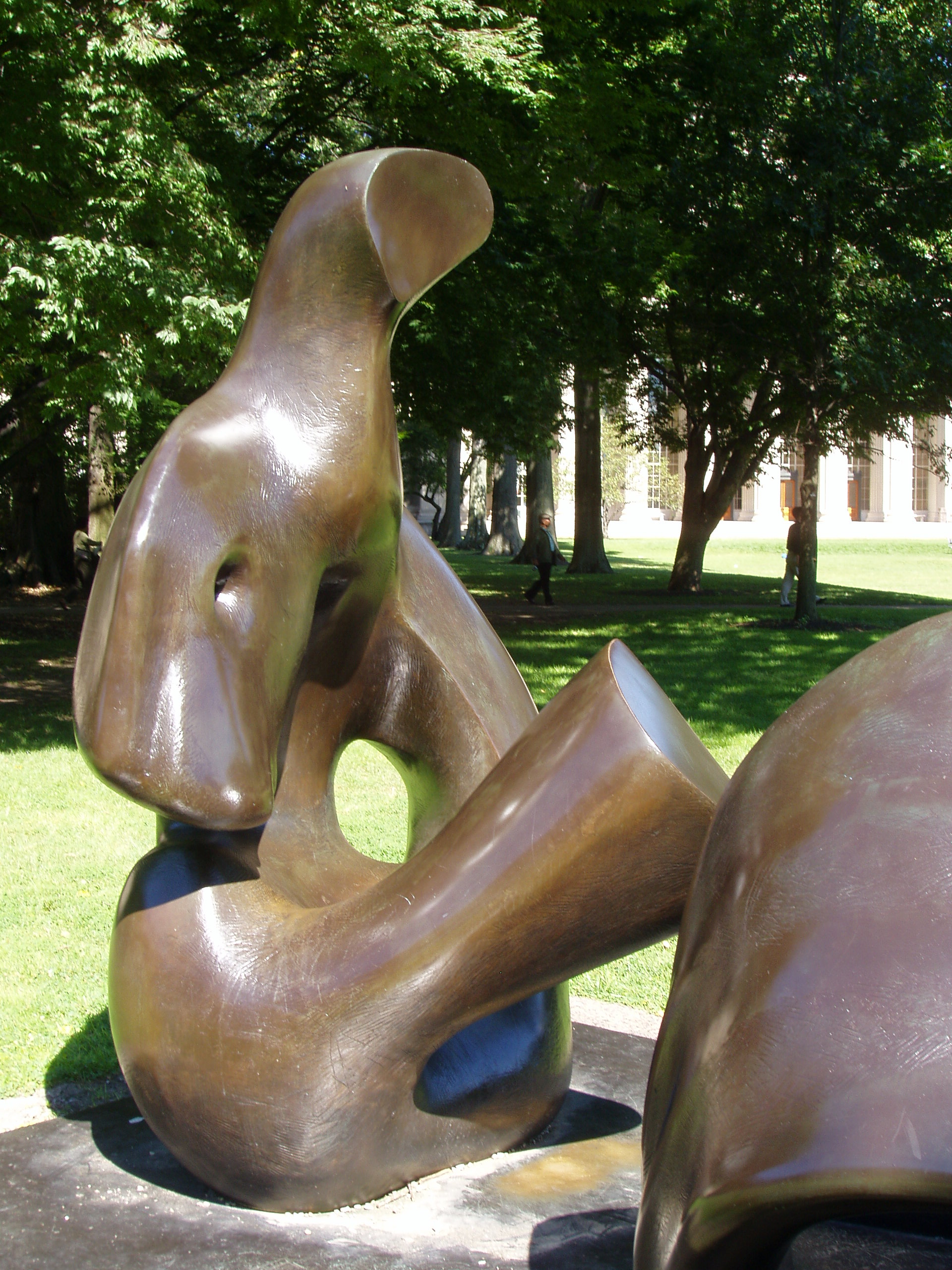
Three Piece Reclining Figure: Draped (1976) by Henry Moore

== More distant facilities ==
- Isolated "on campus" offices exist northeast of Kendall Square, in East Cambridge.
- Endicott House conference center is in Dedham, Massachusetts
- MIT Lincoln Laboratory for military research is in Lexington, Massachusetts
- Bates Research and Engineering Center (formerly Bates Linear Accelerator) is in Middleton, Massachusetts
- Haystack Observatory is in Westford, Massachusetts, co-located with the Wallace Astrophysical Observatory and the Millstone Hill Observatory
- On-campus phones use tie lines to enable free calls to these facilities as well as the Woods Hole Oceanographic Institute, with which MIT has a joint degree program.

== Affiliated facilities ==
- The Broad Institute and Whitehead Institute in Kendall Square are nominally independent, but partly staffed by MIT faculty
- On-campus phones previously used tie lines to make free calls to institutions with which MIT has joint research or instructional programs, including Draper Laboratory (a spin-off military research lab) Harvard University, Harvard Medical School, Massachusetts General Hospital, Mount Auburn Hospital, and Wellesley College. MIT, Harvard, and Wellesley are connected by a weekday shuttle for cross-registered students, and on weekends by the Wellesley College Senate bus. Faculty and students also occasionally learn and teach at field facilities around the world.
- Many MIT-affiliated fraternities, sororities, and independent living groups (FSILGs) own private buildings in the Back Bay and Fenway–Kenmore neighborhoods in Boston. They are connected to MITNet via private Internet lines, but not to the campus phone system.
- The joint Massachusetts Green High Performance Computing Center is in Holyoke, Massachusetts.

== See also ==
- History of college campuses and architecture in the United States
- Housing at the Massachusetts Institute of Technology
