= Caltech–MIT rivalry =

College rivalry

The college rivalry between the California Institute of Technology (Caltech) and the Massachusetts Institute of Technology (MIT) stems from the colleges' reputations as the top science and engineering schools in the United States. The rivalry is unusual given the geographic distance between the schools, one being in Pasadena, California, and the other in Cambridge, Massachusetts (their campuses are separated by about 3000 miles and are on opposite coasts of the United States, with Caltech and MIT being on the West Coast and Eastern Seaboard respectively), as well as its focus on elaborate pranks rather than sporting events.

One pranking war was instigated in April 2005, when Caltech students pulled multiple pranks during MIT's Campus Preview Weekend for prospective freshmen. MIT students responded a year later by stealing Caltech's antique Fleming cannon and transporting it across the country to MIT's campus. Subsequent pranks have included fake satirical school newspapers distributed by Caltech students at MIT and the appearance of a TARDIS device on top of Caltech's Baxter Hall.

== Schools ==
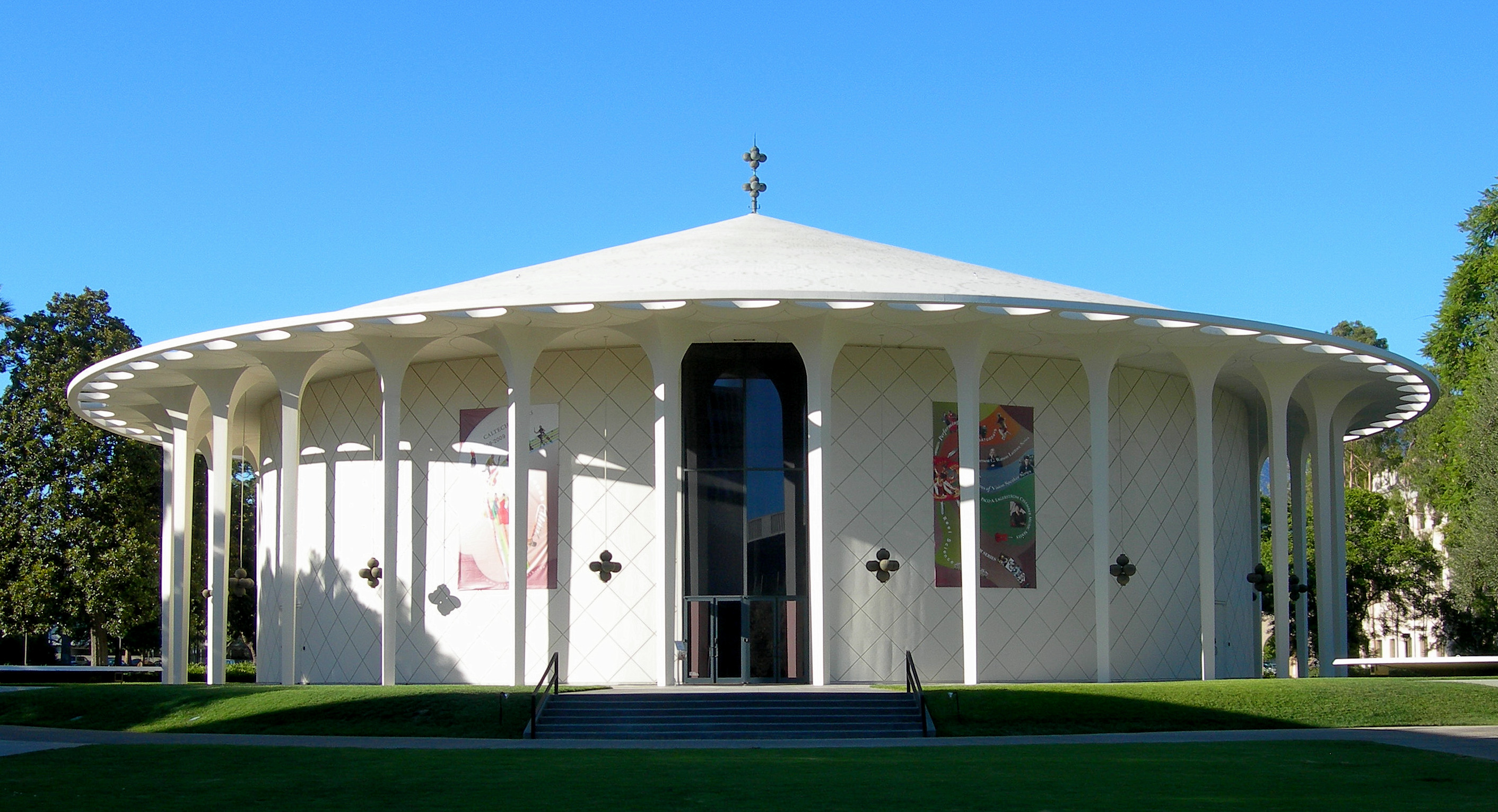
Caltech's Beckman Auditorium

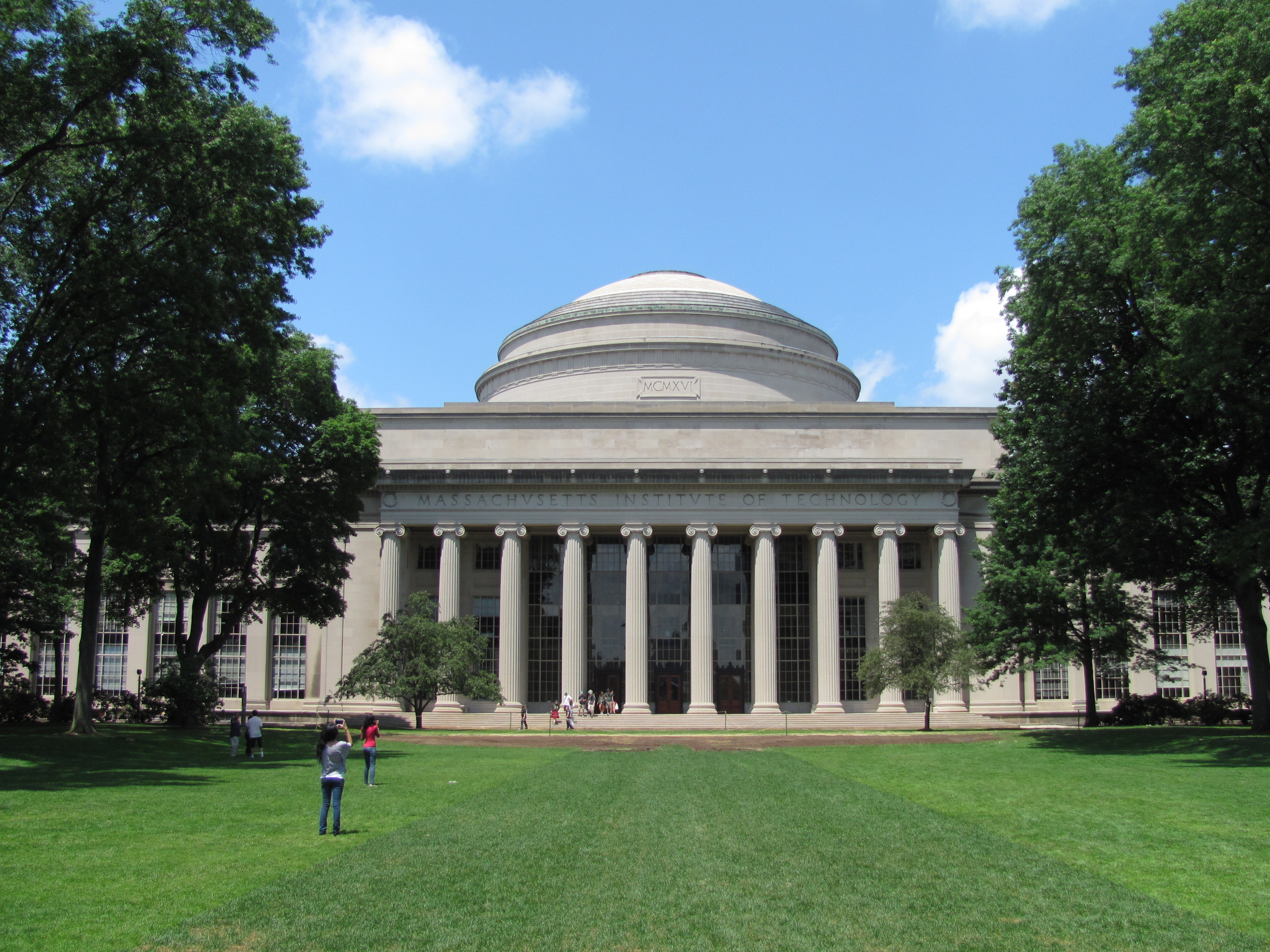
MIT's Great Dome

Caltech is located in Pasadena, California, 11 miles northeast of downtown Los Angeles. It was founded in 1891 and adopted its current name in 1920. Caltech enrolled just under 1000 undergraduates and almost 1200 graduate students for the 2011–2012 academic year. Despite its small size, 31 Caltech alumni and faculty have won the Nobel Prize and 66 have won the National Medal of Science or Technology, and Caltech was ranked first in the 2011–2016 Times Higher Education worldwide rankings of universities, whereas MIT was ranked first in the rival QS World University Rankings over the same period. Curiously from 2004-2009, The Times HES and QS collaborated to produce joint rankings.

Caltech has a long history of off-campus pranks, which are sometimes referred to as "RFs". (RF is short for "ratfuck", referring to the shattering of a frozen dead rat in someone's room.) The most notable of these pranks include the 1961 Great Rose Bowl Hoax, where a card stunt was altered to display "Caltech" rather than the name of one of the competing teams. Caltech students also altered the scoreboard display during the 1984 Rose Bowl to show Caltech beating MIT 38–9, and in May 1987 changed the Hollywood Sign to read "CALTECH".

MIT was founded in 1861, and is located in Cambridge, Massachusetts, directly across the Charles River from central Boston. MIT enrolled 4512 undergraduates and 6807 graduate students for the 2014-2015 academic year. 85 Nobel laureates and 28 National Medal of Science or Technology recipients are currently or have previously been affiliated with the university.

MIT also has a long tradition of pranks, which are called "hacks" at that institution. Many hacks involve placing an item on MIT's Great Dome or otherwise altering, such as moving a campus police cruiser to its roof, placing full-sized replicas of the Wright Flyer and a firetruck on top of it to acknowledge the anniversaries of first powered controlled flight and the September 11th attacks respectively, and converting it into R2-D2 and a large yellow ring to acknowledge the release of Star Wars Episode I and Lord of the Rings respectively. A famous off-campus hack involved MIT students inflating a weather balloon labeled "MIT" at the 50-yard line at the Harvard/Yale football game in 1982.

Pranks at the two institutions are seen as a way to relax from the stress of the notoriously rigorous academics of each. Both Caltech and MIT have a set of pranking ethics, stating that pranks should be reversible and not cause permanent damage, and emphasize creativity and originality. In recent years, pranking has been officially encouraged by Tom Mannion, Caltech's assistant vice president for student affairs and campus life. "The grand old days of pranking have gone away at Caltech, and that's what we are trying to bring back," reported The Boston Globe, which noted that "security has orders not to intervene in a prank unless officers get Mannion's approval beforehand." However, hacks at MIT are generally more secretive and often do not involve identifying the hackers.

== Pranks ==
=== 1984 Rose Bowl scoreboard prank ===
In 1984, Caltech students hacked the scoreboard from the Rose Bowl Game between UCLA and Illinois to show Caltech beating MIT with a score of 38–9. The score was published in The California Tech as a front-page headline. None of the prank designers said anything about the choice of MIT as the victim, as if it were obvious whom they should prank.

=== 2005 Campus Preview Weekend pranks ===
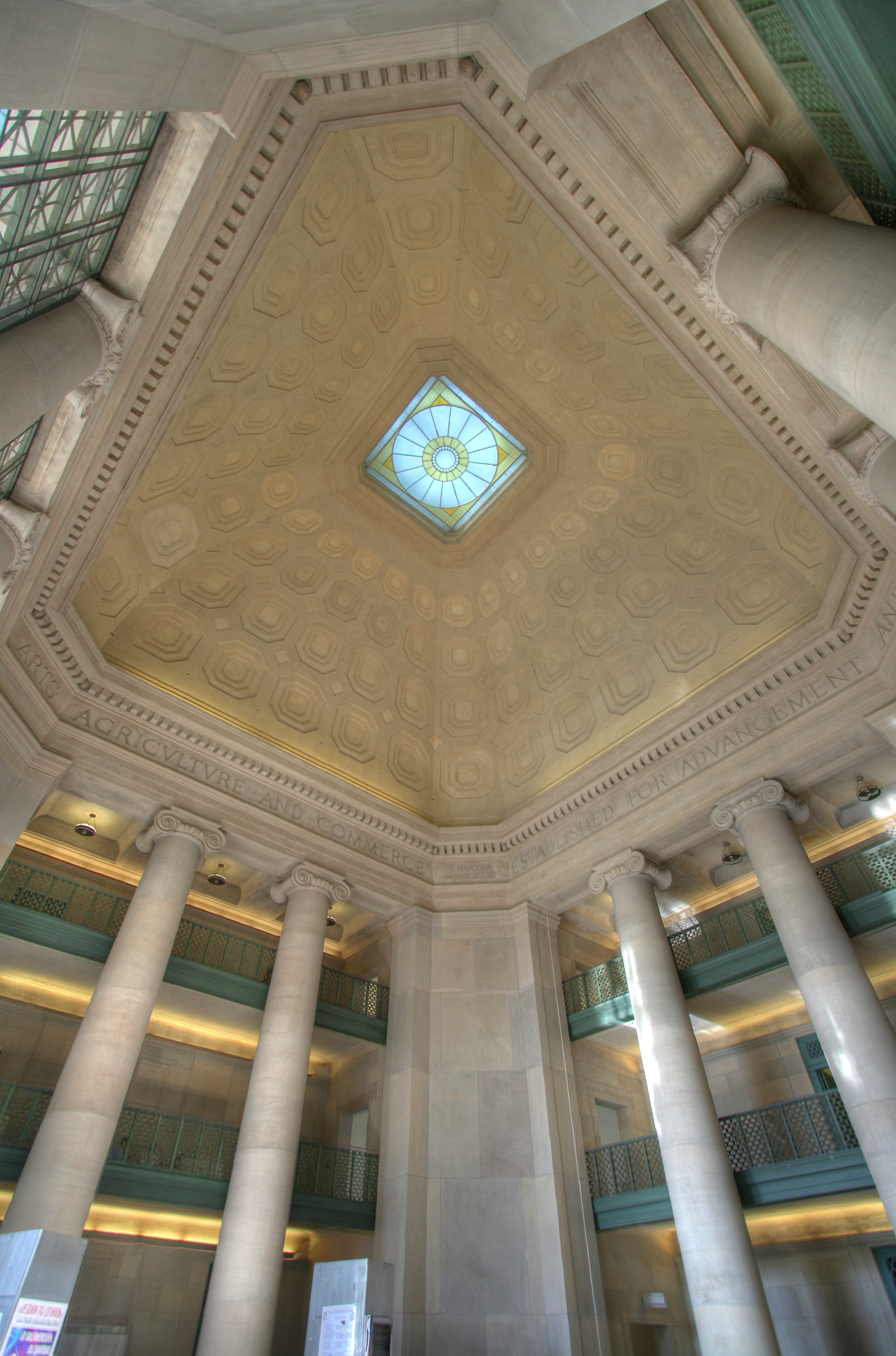
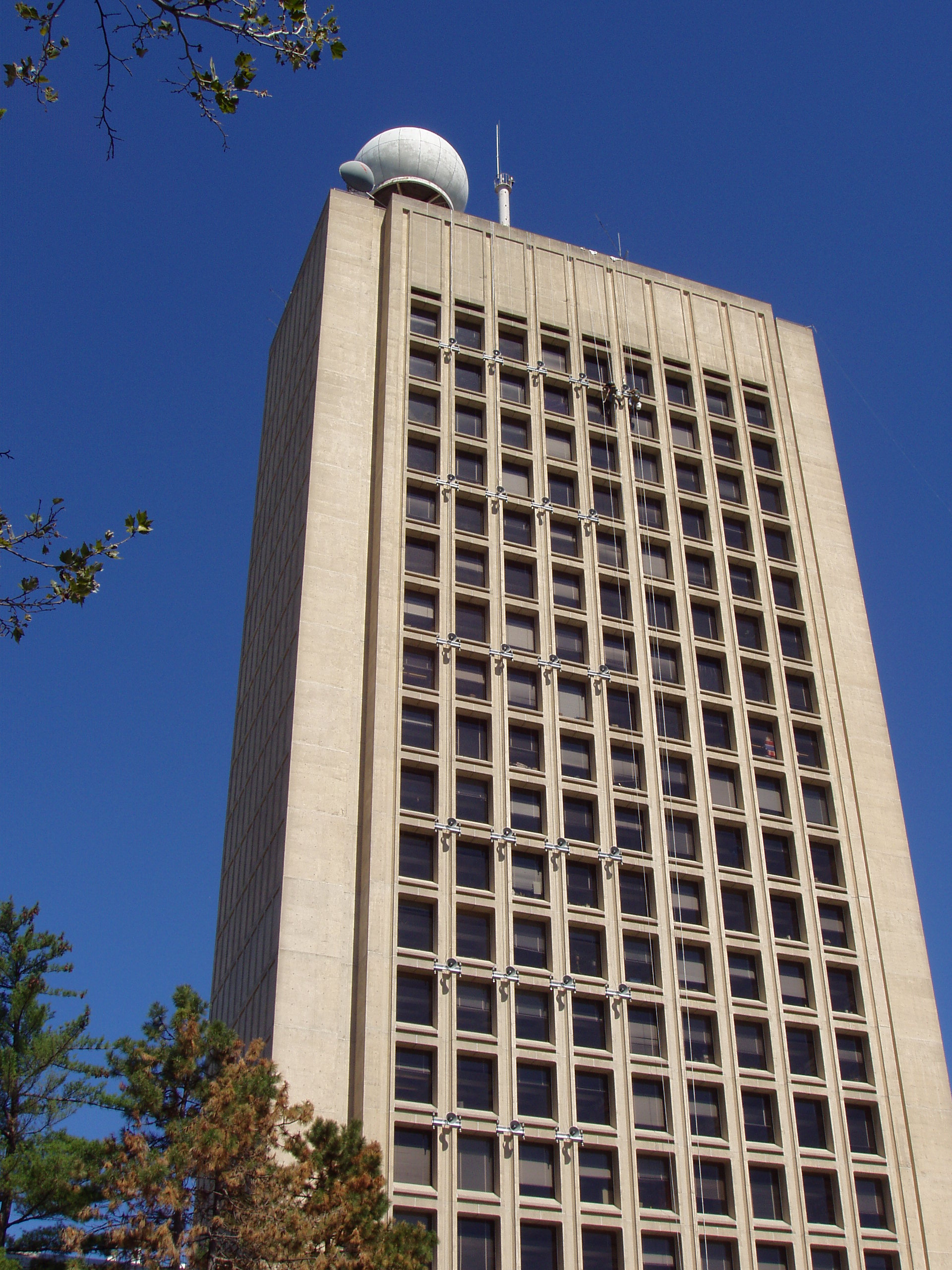
Caltech pranksters floated a large blimp with the letters "CIT" in the interior of MIT's Lobby 7 (left), and wrote the letters "CALTECH" on the Green Building (right) with a laser.

In April 2005, Caltech students instigated a series of pranks during MIT's Campus Preview Weekend:

- Caltech students snuck into two fairs for the prospective freshmen and handed out 400 T-shirts that were packaged so that "MIT" was visible on the front, but the reverse design, the words "because not everybody can go to Caltech" and a drawing of a palm tree, were obscured until the package was opened.
- Inflatable palm trees were placed on the Great Dome and in the Tomb of the Unknown Tool, an important location in MIT's roof and tunnel hacking culture, after the Caltech students had snuck into a "Tangerine Tour" of these locations intended for prospective freshmen.
- A hundred orange balloons (orange being Caltech's official color) and a large blimp with the letters "CIT" were floated inside Lobby 7.
- The inscription on the exterior of the Lobby 7 dome facing Massachusetts Avenue was changed to read "That Other Institute of Technology" instead of "Massachusetts Institute of Technology".
- The letters "CALTECH" were written on the Green Building with a green laser.

The group responsible for the laser dedicated the entire weekend to completing it, working on electronics for three designs operating on different principles, which yielded one working device. The Caltech students intended to upgrade the laser to show three-dimensional rotating and animated letters by using stereo sound signals encoded on a compact disc to control mirrors to deflect the laser beam. MIT campus police and students were initially frustrated in their attempts to locate the source of the laser, but the students were eventually able to trace it and Caltech students turned it off just before the upgraded electronics could be installed. Caltech students had also produced genuine-looking MIT ID cards featuring their real names and photographs, but did not need to use them.

MIT students counterpranked the Lobby 7 dome to read "The Only Institute of Technology", and had to resort to pulling the blimp down using helium balloons covered in sticky tape. One student unsuccessfully attempted to DDOS the Caltech students' website documenting the pranks. The pranks were seen as a way to merge Caltech and MIT's independent but similar pranking cultures. Campus Preview Weekend was chosen because the Caltech students would blend in with the unfamiliar prospective freshmen, and to increase the pranks' visibility. MIT Dean of Admissions Marilee Jones said, "I think it's hilarious. I consider hacks a performance art, and I like the concept of inter-institute rivalry."

=== 2006 Fleming cannon heist ===
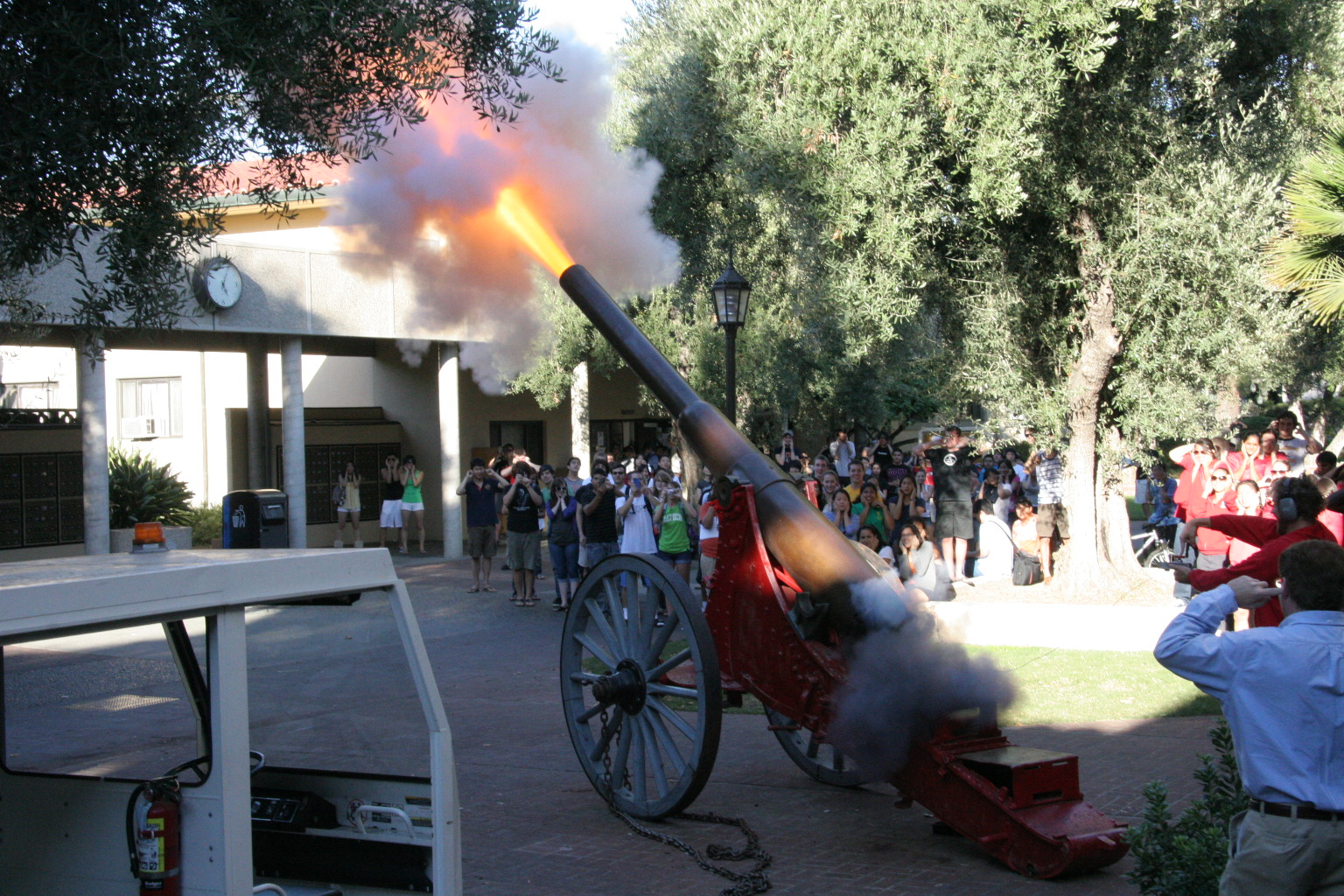
The Fleming cannon, pictured here at Caltech, is routinely fired to mark the end of academic terms, Ditch Day, the end of Rotation, and the graduation of the Fleming House president during Commencement.

Caltech is home to the 1.7-ton, 130-year-old Fleming cannon. The origins and exact age of the Fleming cannon are not known with certainty. It is believed to have been cast during the Franco-Prussian War era, but completed in 1878 after the war was over. It was then given by the French to the United States where it was re-bored to fit American shells and the carriage constructed, but this work was completed too late for it to see use in the Spanish–American War. The cannon soon became obsolete and was donated to Southwestern Academy in San Marino, California, where it was displayed on the front lawn starting in 1925. By 1972, the school was seeking to discard the cannon, and a group of Caltech students from Fleming House took possession of the cannon and laboriously restored it to working condition. The cannon was returned to Southwestern in 1975 at the insistence of the Caltech administration, but it was permanently restored to Caltech in 1981. The cannon is one of the few objects at Caltech that is designated as unprankable given its age, fragility, and irreplaceable nature.

On March 28, 2006, the cannon disappeared from the Caltech campus, having been taken by people posing as contractors, fooling a security guard with a phony work order. At the time, the cannon was not at its normal location outside Fleming House, where it is normally locked to the ground, due to ongoing renovations. The identity of the perpetrators was initially unknown, and there was speculation that it had been stolen by nearby Harvey Mudd College, who had been responsible for a well-known theft of the cannon almost twenty years prior.

However, it was soon revealed that the cannon had been appropriated by MIT in retaliation for the previous year's pranks, and relocated to Cambridge. The MIT team consisted of about 30 hackers, of which two flew to Pasadena and five drove cross-country. While acquiring the cannon disguised as construction contractors, the hackers had run-ins with a Caltech security guard and physical plant worker, to whom they explained that they were moving the cannon in preparation for the pouring of a concrete pedestal. Once off Caltech's campus, a local resident called in a noise complaint, and the Pasadena police arrived but did not recognize the then-disguised cannon. On the way to the shipping company, the trailer's hitch cracked, necessitating a slow trip on surface roads, and on arrival they were unable to physically remove the cannon from the trailer, causing them to spend an extra $1000 for the services of a company that specialized in moving large film props.

On April 6, the cannon appeared in front of the Green Building sporting a giant 21-pound gold-plated aluminum Brass Rat around its barrel, which was positioned to point towards Pasadena, and female MIT students mockingly posted pictures of themselves posing in bikinis with the cannon. It was revealed that preparations for the heist had been underway since December. MIT was softly criticized for not leaving a note explaining that the theft was a prank, as required by Caltech's pranking ethics, which were said to be more stringent than MIT's, but the prank was largely taken in good humor at both campuses.

Fleming House students and alumni quickly began plotting for the return of the cannon, setting up a command center in a trailer on campus and soliciting donations from alumni. Their initial plan was to use a helicopter to fly the cannon out of the MIT campus. Initial arrangements were made with a helicopter company, but Federal Aviation Administration rules ultimately made this untenable. The students instead decided to surreptitiously steal back the cannon under cover of darkness. On the morning of April 10, about two dozen Fleming students, dressed in their signature red Fleming jerseys, descended upon the cannon to reclaim it and begin its journey back to Pasadena. However, MIT students had been tipped off and were waiting for the Caltech students with a friendly barbecue prepared, and played Wagner's Ride of the Valkyries, a forbidden song at Caltech due to its association with final exams, as the Flems entered. The Fleming students left a miniature toy cannon with a note reading, "Here's something a little more your size."

=== Later developments ===
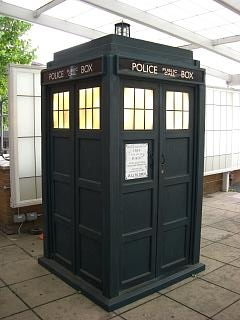
MIT students unsuccessfully tried to place a life-sized model of the TARDIS time machine from the Doctor Who television series on top of Baxter Hall at Caltech; a few months later students from both schools collaborated in erecting the model.

During MIT's CPW in 2007, Caltech distributed a sixteen-page fake edition of MIT's student newspaper, The Tech, containing articles such as "Math Dept. Hires Rising Star Matt Damon", referring to 1997 film Good Will Hunting, and "Infinite Corridor Not Actually Infinite", referring to MIT's iconic main thoroughfare, and a mock advertisement for sperm donation offering more money for Caltech students than MIT students. The prank was inspired by the suggestion that a similar fake-newspaper caper had been perpetrated by the University of Southern California against the University of California, Los Angeles in the past, and the paper was prepared in just two weeks with 15,000 issues printed. The three Caltech students sent to distribute the papers at MIT initially tried to drop the papers at The Tech's normal distribution points, but these were quickly discovered and removed by MIT students. The Caltech students then turned to distributing the papers individually on the sidewalk outside of Lobby 7, a location outside the jurisdiction of the MIT Police.

In 2008, Caltech students provided a "Puzzle Zero" in the MIT Mystery Hunt that when solved, told solvers to call a specific number in the 626 area code immediately. When MIT students dialed the number, they heard, "Thank you for calling the Caltech Admissions Office. If you are another MIT student wishing to transfer to Caltech, please download our transfer application form from www.caltech.edu. If you are an MIT student not wishing to transfer to Caltech, we wish you the best of luck, and hope you find happiness someday.... "

Another series of pranks was planned for Thanksgiving weekend in 2009, involving transforming MIT into "Caltech East: School of Humanities". The pranks were planned over the course of six months. Caltech students intended to deploy two large banners that were designed to be easy to place, but removal would require a cherry picker or a rappel. However, the design of MIT's Killian Court prevented the placement of one of them, and another was intercepted by MIT security before its deployment could be completed. Another fake edition of The Tech was released, stating that students would be required to take a core of literature, history, philosophy, and economics, but science subjects would be eliminated. Although the failure of the pranks was considered to be a disappointment, Caltech and MIT students afterwards shared breakfast at a local diner.

In September 2010, MIT hackers attempted to place a TARDIS time machine on the roof of Baxter Hall at Caltech, but were foiled by Caltech Security. It was stated that this was due to MIT students' failure to tell the Caltech administration about the prank in advance. However, in January 2011, Caltech and MIT students cooperated in placing the TARDIS on the roof. The TARDIS had previously been seen on the MIT Great Dome in August 2010, and was subsequently transported to buildings at the University of California, Berkeley, and then Stanford University.

Caltech pranksters again visited MIT's Campus Preview Weekend in April 2014, this time distributing mugs that displayed the MIT logo when cold, but when filled with hot liquid, turned orange and changed to read "Caltech: The Hotter Institute of Technology". Caltech students handed out the mugs to prospective students outside MIT's formal welcoming event. MIT admissions officers tried to stop the Caltech students unless they could prove they were a registered event, but Caltech Prank Club President Julie Jester stalled them for 20 minutes by claiming they were registered through the MIT Alumni Association, pretending to have problems connecting to MIT's WiFi on her smartphone, and calling Caltech Student Activities Director Tom Mannion to get a name of an MIT Alumni Association member. MIT admissions officers reportedly resorted to "ripping the mugs out of prefrosh's hands." MIT admissions officer Chris Peterson later tweeted that the mugs were "snake oil by charlatans from other coasts." Jester later said that "It's been a couple years since we had a good MIT prank.... We wanted to rekindle that relationship," and "pranks are a big element of the Caltech culture.... We’re just a small institution, but we feel that our impact is really bigger than our size. We do cool stuff because we can."

In more recent developments, for April Fools' Day 2024, Caltech and MIT engaged in a collaborative prank, continuing the tradition of friendly rivalry between the two institutions. The event was organized with the involvement of Caltech's Student Activities and the editors of MIT’s student newspaper, The Tech. As part of the prank, the two institutions exchanged satirical newspaper editions. Caltech students, with assistance from The Tech’s editors, produced a spoof issue containing anti-MIT satire, which was distributed on MIT’s campus. Concurrently, MIT students created a mock newspaper titled "The Massachusetts Tech," filled with anti-Caltech content, which was circulated at Caltech.

On a more intimate scale, a contingent of Caltechers put a 6-foot-tall mural of one of their house logos into MIT’s Tomb of the Unknown Tool over Martin Luther King Jr weekend, 2014.

== See also ==
- List of practical joke topics
- Harvey Mudd College § Relations with Caltech
