= Hacks at the Massachusetts Institute of Technology =

Prank at or by MIT, an American university

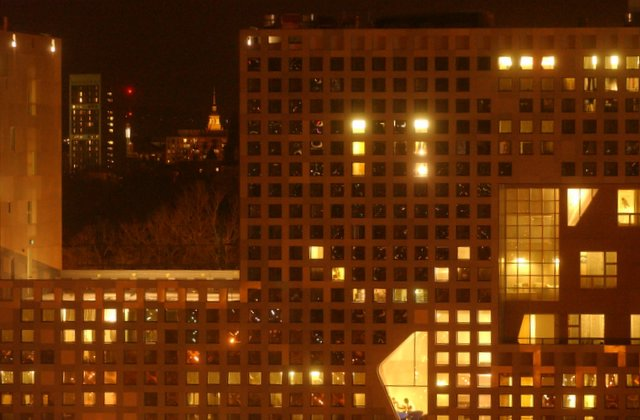
Residents of MIT's Simmons Hall collaborated to make a smiley face on the building's façade, December 8, 2002.

Hacks at the Massachusetts Institute of Technology are practical jokes and pranks meant to prominently demonstrate technical aptitude and cleverness, and/or to commemorate popular culture and political topics. The pranks are anonymously installed at night by hackers, usually, but not exclusively, undergraduate students. The hackers' actions are governed by an informal yet extensive body of precedent, tradition and ethics. Hacks can occur anywhere across campus, and occasionally off campus; many make use of the iconic Great Dome, Little Dome, Green Building tower, or other prominent architectural features of the MIT campus.

The most well-known hacker is Richard Stallman, winner of the MacArthur Prize and initiator of the free software movement. Well-known hacker alumni include Nobel Laureates Richard P. Feynman and George F. Smoot. In October 2009, US President Barack Obama made a reference to the MIT hacking tradition during an on-campus speech about sustainable energy. In recent years, MIT students have used hacks to protest MIT's collaborations with fossil fuel companies as well as the Israeli military and arms suppliers during the Gaza genocide.

== History and commemoration ==
Although the practice is unsanctioned by the university, and students have sometimes been arraigned on trespassing charges for hacking, hacks have substantial significance to MIT's history and student culture. Student bloggers working for the MIT Admissions Office have often written about MIT hacks, including those occurring during Campus Preview Weekend (CPW), an event welcoming admitted prospective freshman students. Alumni bloggers on the MIT Alumni Association website also report and document some of the more memorable hacks. Since the mid-1970s, the student-written guide How To Get Around MIT (HowToGAMIT) has included a chapter on hacking, and discusses history, hacker groups, ethics, safety tips, and risks of the activity.

For a decade, the MIT Museum included a "Hall of Hacks" featuring famous MIT hacks, but the section was closed in 2001, temporarily returning for a 2003 exhibition. In 2011, the display space was reallocated to the MIT 150 exhibition, a year-long show commemorating MIT's 150th anniversary. Although hacks were not featured in the exhibit, certain student activities such as the Annual Baker House Piano Drop were featured in the exhibition. The Museum's extensive collection of hacker artifacts and documentation continues to be preserved and expanded, with a selection of larger relics from past hacks plus explanatory panels and plaques semi-permanently displayed inside the Stata Center. This mini-exhibit on hacks is located on the ground floor of the Stata Center, near the cafeteria at the southeastern end of the complex, and may be viewed by visitors during normal office hours.

Famous hacks include a weather balloon labeled "MIT" appearing at the 50-yard line at the Harvard/Yale football game in 1982, the placing of a campus police cruiser on the roof of the Great Dome, converting the Great Dome into R2-D2 or a large yellow ring to acknowledge the release of Star Wars Episode I and Lord of the Rings respectively, or placing full-sized replicas of the Wright Flyer and a fire truck to acknowledge the anniversaries of first powered controlled flight and the September 11 attacks respectively.

== Terminology ==
At MIT, the terms hack and hacker have many shades of meaning, though they are closely linked historically and culturally with computer hacking (in its original non-computer-cracker sense), collegiate practical jokes, and even culture jamming. The origin of this usage is unknown, but it seems to have been widespread at MIT by the 1960s, and the hacker ethic has since spread into cyberculture and beyond. Over time, the term has been generalized to describe anybody who possesses great technical proficiency in any particular skill, usually combined with an offbeat sense of humor. Spectacular pranks are the most visible aspect of this hacker culture to the world at large, but many hacker subcultures exist at MIT, and elsewhere.

Roof and tunnel hacking, a form of urban exploration, is also related to but not identical to "hacking" as described in this article. Some hacks do involve overcoming barriers to physical access (e.g. placing a half-scale Apollo Lunar Module atop the Great Dome), but many other stunts do not require such specialized skills.

== Cultural aspects ==
Viewed from an anthropological perspective, hacking is a cultural tradition affirming group solidarity, but some hacks can also be viewed as individualistic creative or artistic expression. For example, the "Massachusetts Toolpike" hack was a clear instance of installation art or environmental art. Hacks which involve staged public actions (e.g. a zombie march or the Time Traveler Convention of 2005) are clearly a form of performance art, often combined with body art and cosplay. Still other hacks have a strong conceptual art flavor, often satirizing other purported works of conceptual art. Sometimes the boundaries have been deliberately blurred, for example when a satirical work of "conceptual art" (No Knife: a study in mixed media earth tones, number three) was surreptitiously added to a "serious" art gallery show at the List Visual Arts Center.

"Tribute", "memorial", or "commemorative" hacks note the arrival, passing, or anniversary of some noteworthy person, tradition, institution, or idea (e.g. the 10th anniversary of Wikipedia). Another broad category of hacks contains strong elements of social commentary or street protest (e.g. "Nth Annual Spontaneous Tuition Riot") about events on campus or in the world at large. But the strongest element of many hacks is the sheer joy of conceptualizing something new, and then reifying it with effective engineering, both technical and social (e.g. installing a full-sized mockup solar-powered subway car on the parapet wall around the base of the Great Dome, and then driving it back and forth under remote wireless control from Killian Court, some five stories below, after sundown).

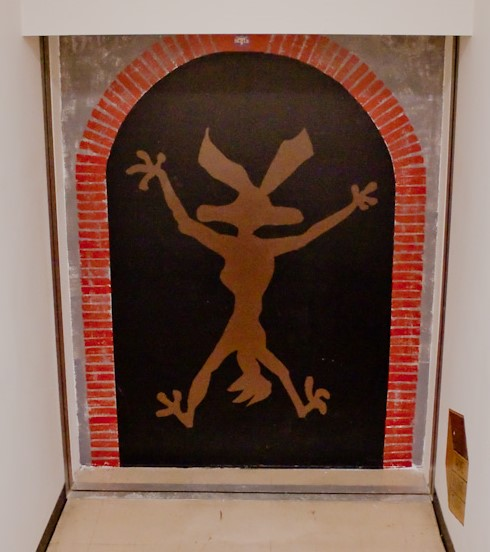
A mural of Wile E. Coyote smashed into the wall of the Rotch Library.

Like most art exhibitions, the great majority of hacks are temporary installations; most are removed within a day or so by MIT Physical Plant, the MIT Confined Space Rescue Team (CSRT), or occasionally by the hackers themselves. It is a traditional courtesy to leave a note or even engineering drawings behind, as an aid to safe de-installation of a hack. Sometimes, the hacks have been de-installed so quickly that members of the MIT community and the general public have had little opportunity to view them. On very rare occasions, community protests have caused the MIT administration to quietly allow a hack to be re-installed and left for a proper viewing interval. The results of certain hacks (often wall murals) have been considered "permanent improvements" to the campus environment, and have been left in place indefinitely, most notably the "Smoot marks" on the Harvard Bridge. The MIT Museum maintains an extensive collection of original hacker artifacts and documentation, and displays some larger items semi-permanently in the Stata Center.

Although many traditional college pranks have involved maximizing embarrassment or inconvenience for a victim or target, often with a personal or political point to make versus harassment, such antics are usually disparaged by MIT hackers as "unimaginative" or "boring". Often the target of a hack is an abstract concept (e.g. bureaucracy or political correctness, or entropy), and the prank may or may not be aimed at any specific individual. Even when an individual is targeted (e.g. the "disappearing office" of newly arrived MIT President Charles Vest), the jest is good-natured, often eliciting admiration rather than anger from the "victim".

Writers for the third-party, independent Internet prankster site Zug once compared humorous responses at MIT and Harvard, by posting similar banners over main entrances to their respective campuses which proclaimed "Institute of Nowlege". Regarding Harvard, they concluded, "The question: is the sense of humor still alive in modern-day Harvard students? The answer, it turns out, is no." Regarding MIT, they said, "So it's official: MIT students have a better sense of humor, hands down, than Harvard students. MIT students are more imaginative, more fun-loving, and probably smarter as well. Truly, MIT is the Institute of NOWLEGE." The Zug pranksters also noted and documented great differences in the reactions of campus police, maintenance workers, and passersby, upon seeing the ironically punned banners.

MIT hacks can push the limits of technical skill, and sometimes fail in spite of meticulous planning. Even these engineering failures have been acknowledged to have educational value, and sometimes a follow-up attempt succeeds. One hack on the Great Dome is documented as having finally succeeded on the fourth try, after a complete re-engineering of both the installed artifact and the installation method.

Smaller projects that can be completed by an individual student are sometimes accorded the honorific "a great hack" by other students, if they combine technical elegance with a hackish sense of humor. For example, an MIT undergrad transformed an ordinary grocery shopping cart into a high-performance electric vehicle, and was frequently seen riding around campus in his "LOLrioKart". The shopping cart had a claimed top speed over 45 miles per hour (72 km/h), and also had a complex steering wheel linkage and a low turning radius for maneuverability in tight spaces. The student was a strong advocate of the Open Source Hardware philosophy, and incorporated detailed documentation of his projects and a tutorial on building custom wheel hub motors in his blog. The ersatz vehicle was prominently displayed at many MIT events, as well as at the Cambridge Science Festival. As a crowning mark of recognition by the outside world, the LOLrioKart driver once received a traffic ticket from the Cambridge Police, a copy of which was proudly displayed online.

Some of the most successful large-scale hacks (e.g. the Caltech cannon heist) have involved multiple teams of hackers working on coordinated but diverse subtasks such as fund-raising, "social engineering", rigging, transportation logistics, gold electroplating, and precision numerical controlled machining, calling on a wide range of technical and management skills. Some hacker teams have gone on to found start-up business ventures, though they may be reluctant to reveal their earlier exploits until many years have passed.

== Famous hacks ==
One classic hack occurred on May 9, 1994, involving a police car with its flashing warning lights operating. The unusual aspect of this hack was its position—on top of MIT's Great Dome. The car was found to be a gutted, junked, heavy Chevrolet Cavalier, painted meticulously to match the MIT Campus Police patrol cars. The car's number was pi. Its license plate read "IHTFP", the abbreviation for MIT's unofficial slogan. A dummy dressed as a campus patrolman was seated inside with mug of coffee and a box of donuts. Some years later, the police car has now been semi-permanently re-installed in the Stata Center as an all-time classic.

Due to MIT's proximity to Harvard, many hacks involve the annual Harvard–Yale football game. Because of the Cambridge rivalry between MIT and Harvard, hackers often are found at the games, and they have come up with some of the most famous hacks in the Institute's history.

One such notable hack attempt targeting the 1948 Harvard–Yale football game involved the use of primer cord. One night shortly before the game MIT students snuck into the Harvard stadium and buried primer cord just under the field. The plan was to burn the letters MIT into the middle of the field during the game. However, their work was uncovered by groundskeepers and disabled. During the game the hackers were apprehended while wearing heavy coats on a fair-weather day. The coats were lined with batteries, obviously intended to be used to detonate the primer cord. An apocryphal story is that an MIT dean came to their defense, opening his own battery-lined coat and claiming that "all Tech men carry batteries"; an MIT dean did show up, but he was not wearing batteries. This phrase has since become common among MIT students.

The Harvard-Yale football game was again the target of MIT hackers in 1982 when a large weather balloon painted with "MIT" all around was inflated, seemingly from nowhere, in the middle of the field. The next day the Boston Herald ran the headline "MIT 1—Harvard–Yale 0: Tech Pranksters Steal the Show". The 1982 Harvard–Yale hack earned acclaim as winner of "Hack Madness", a March Madness-themed contest sponsored by the MIT Alumni Association in 2014 to determine "the greatest MIT hack of all time".

In 1990 an MIT banner was successfully launched from an end zone using a model rocket engine shortly before Yale attempted a field goal kick. In 1996, the Harvard logos on the scoreboard were hacked from VE-RI-TAS to read HU-GE-EGO instead.

Another traditional hacking target has been the bronze statue of John Harvard, the namesake of Harvard University. The statue itself was sculpted by Daniel Chester French, a respected artist who studied at MIT, who is best known for his statue of Abraham Lincoln at the Lincoln Memorial in Washington, DC. Because of its visible location in Harvard Yard and its symbolic significance, the John Harvard statue has been fitted with an unending sequence of "accessories". MIT hackers are hardly alone; Dartmouth College pranksters like to paint the statue green, Yale pranksters prefer blue, and others have dressed the statue in women's underwear. MIT hackers like to go a few steps further, fitting the statue with a plaster leg cast after a crushing football defeat, and disguising the statue as the Unabomber after that infamous Harvard alumnus was arrested. John Harvard has worn a Brass Rat from time to time, and has donned a Halo combat helmet and brandished a Halo assault rifle to mark the release of the Halo 3 first-person shooter video game. In accordance with hacker ethics, great care is taken to ensure that the hacks can be removed without causing permanent damage to Harvard's treasured symbol.

The cleverness of many MIT hacks has even resulted in urban legends about supposed hacks that may not have occurred. One rumored hack involved a certain student's adherence to classical conditioning behavior response, as studied by Harvard Professor B. F. Skinner. Throughout the off-season, this supposed student visited the Harvard football stadium during his lunch break. He dressed in a black and white striped shirt and trousers, filled his pockets with bird-seed, then went on the field, blew a whistle, and spread his birdseed on the field. The result of all of this effort, the story goes, is that on opening day as the Harvard football team took the field to face their opponent, the referee blew his whistle to signal the start of the game, and the field was suddenly inundated by a flock of birds looking for their lunch. Despite sounding like a classic MIT hack, this particular prank has never been verified. The author of a 1990 book about pranks pulled by MIT students stated that he had not come across clear documentation of this tale during his years of research.

On the other hand, at least one hack involved a staged event that never occurred, when hackers convinced major news media that they had created an indoor snowstorm in Baker House dormitory.

When MIT replaced older mercury-vapor lamps with high-efficiency LED lamps to illuminate the Great Dome, hackers started changing the color of the lights to reflect various occasions—Earth Day, the Fourth of July, etc. Although reprogramming the lights is technically straightforward, these Great Dome lighting hacks are very visible from Boston's Back Bay district, across the Charles River.

In September 2011, hackers installed 153 (= 9 × 17) custom-made wirelessly-controlled color-changing high-power LED lights into every window above the first floor of the 295-foot-tall (90 m) tall MIT Green Building. They displayed a waving American flag throughout the evening of September 11, 2011 in remembrance of the September 11 attacks. For a short time in the early morning of September 12, the lights displayed a Tetris game, thus realizing a long-standing hack proposal, the "Holy Grail" of hacks. The display hardware had occasional glitches, and was removed as of September 13. The hardware and software designs were further developed and refined for better reliability. On April 20, 2012, MIT hackers successfully turned the Green Building into a huge playable Tetris game, operated from a wireless control podium at a comfortable viewing distance in front of the building. Visitors to Campus Preview Weekend (a gathering for admitted prospective freshman students) were invited to play the game on the colossal 80-by-250-foot (24 m × 76 m) display grid, which was claimed to be the second-largest full-color video display in the US.

Instead of a one-shot temporary installation, the hackers have designed and built a permanent facility that can be re-used repeatedly by the MIT community. An understanding has been reached with the EAPS Department, which is headquartered in the Green Building, to allow the light display hardware to remain installed in each window. To avoid annoying the occupants and to allow late-working staff to "opt out", each light display is equipped with a manual override button, which will disable the pixel lighting for that window for several hours after it is pressed. In addition, the hackers have released open-source software tools used to develop new display patterns, so that others can design and deploy new stationary or animated images, in cooperation with the hacker engineers.

== Protest hacks ==
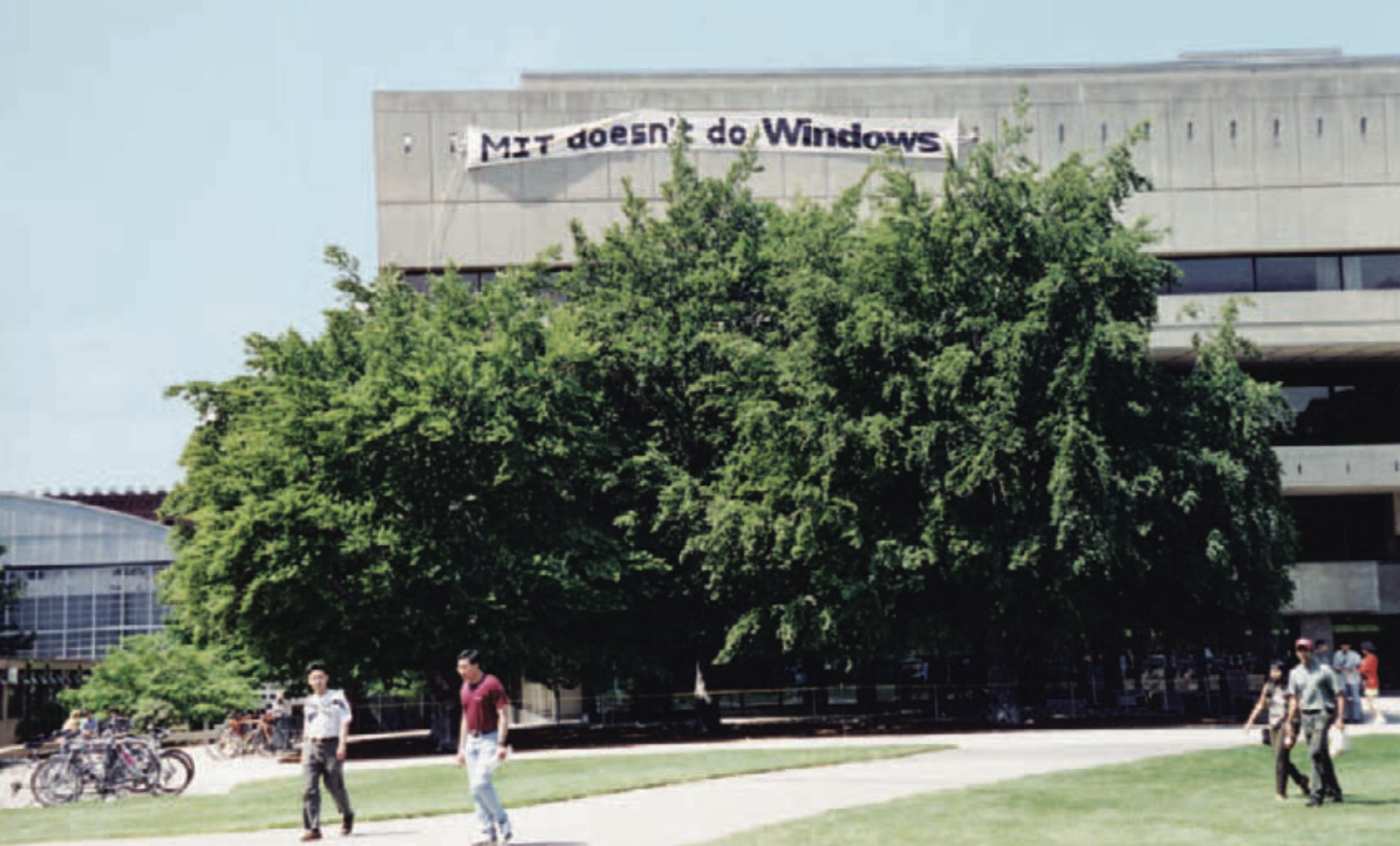
"MIT doesn't do Windows" sign hack on Stratton Student Center, 1996

MIT students have used hacks to protest university administration policies. In 1985, anonymous students modified a road sign on Memorial Drive in front of Killian Court to say "M.i.T monster eats Boston/Back Bay" bringing attention to gentrification. In 1996, hackers installed a modular dorm room inside a museum display case, complete with miniaturized furniture, books, and food as part of a "Housing 2000 project" to satirize cramped housing conditions. The same year, hackers dropped a banner from the student center protesting the monopolistic dominance of Microsoft Windows.

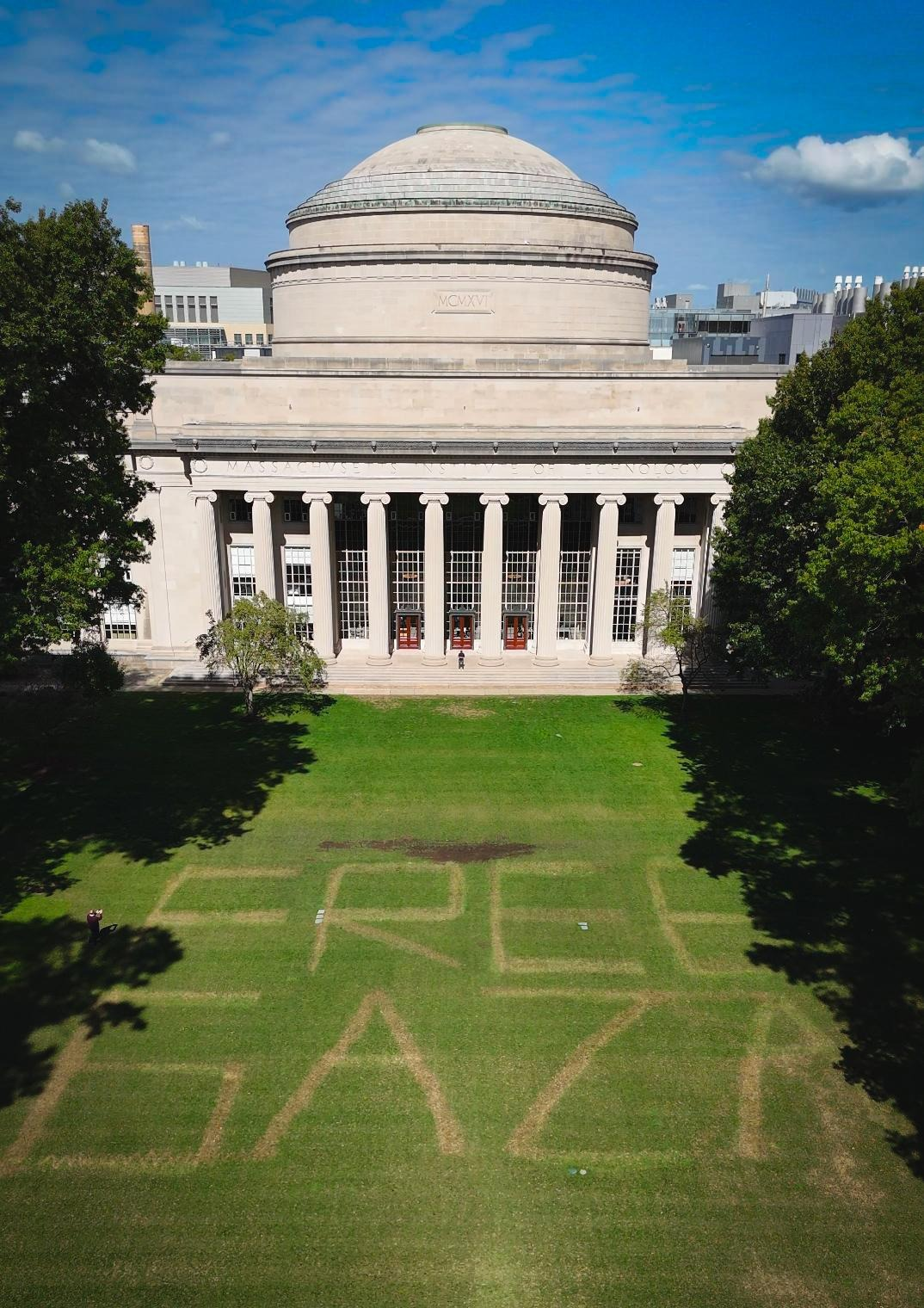
MIT students carved 'Free Gaza' into grass turf in front of the Great Dome, October 2, 2024.

More recently, MIT hackers have also commented on political issues such as climate change and the Israeli occupation of Palestine. In 2019, an anonymous group covered a portrait of MIT donor and oil company executive David Koch depicting in the activists' words, "an impressionist rendering of a flaming offshore drilling rig filling the sky with smoke and the sea with oil.". In May 2022, MIT students wrapped a caution tape around campus buildings with the words "CLIMATE CHANGE FLOOD LEVEL" and "MIT: DIVEST FROM FOSSIL FUELS NOW." Since the outbreak of the Gaza war in October 2023, MIT students have deployed Palestine-themed hacks on campus that draw attention to institutional complicity. The following list gives some examples.

Date	Hack	the point/notes
May 2025	'Abolition means Free Palestine' display in Building 10.	Painting of Emma Rogers, wife of MIT founder and slaveowner William Barton Rogers was replaced with a memorial to Isabella Gibbons and Palestinian child Yaqeen Hammad killed in Gaza that day.
Oct 2024	'Free Gaza' message carved into Killian Court in front of Dome	As part of 2024 pro-Palestine protests, MIT hackers carved the words 'Free Gaza' into the grass turf in front of the Great Dome.
Sept 2024	'Lockheed Martin Kills Kids in Gaza' above MIT Career Fair	Banner rolls out above MIT's 2024 Fall Career Fair, targeting Lockheed Martin's weapon sales to Israel during the Gaza war.

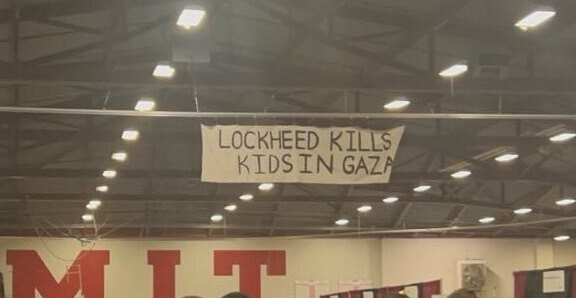
Sign above MIT fall career fair, protesting Lockheed Martin's presence, September 20, 2024.

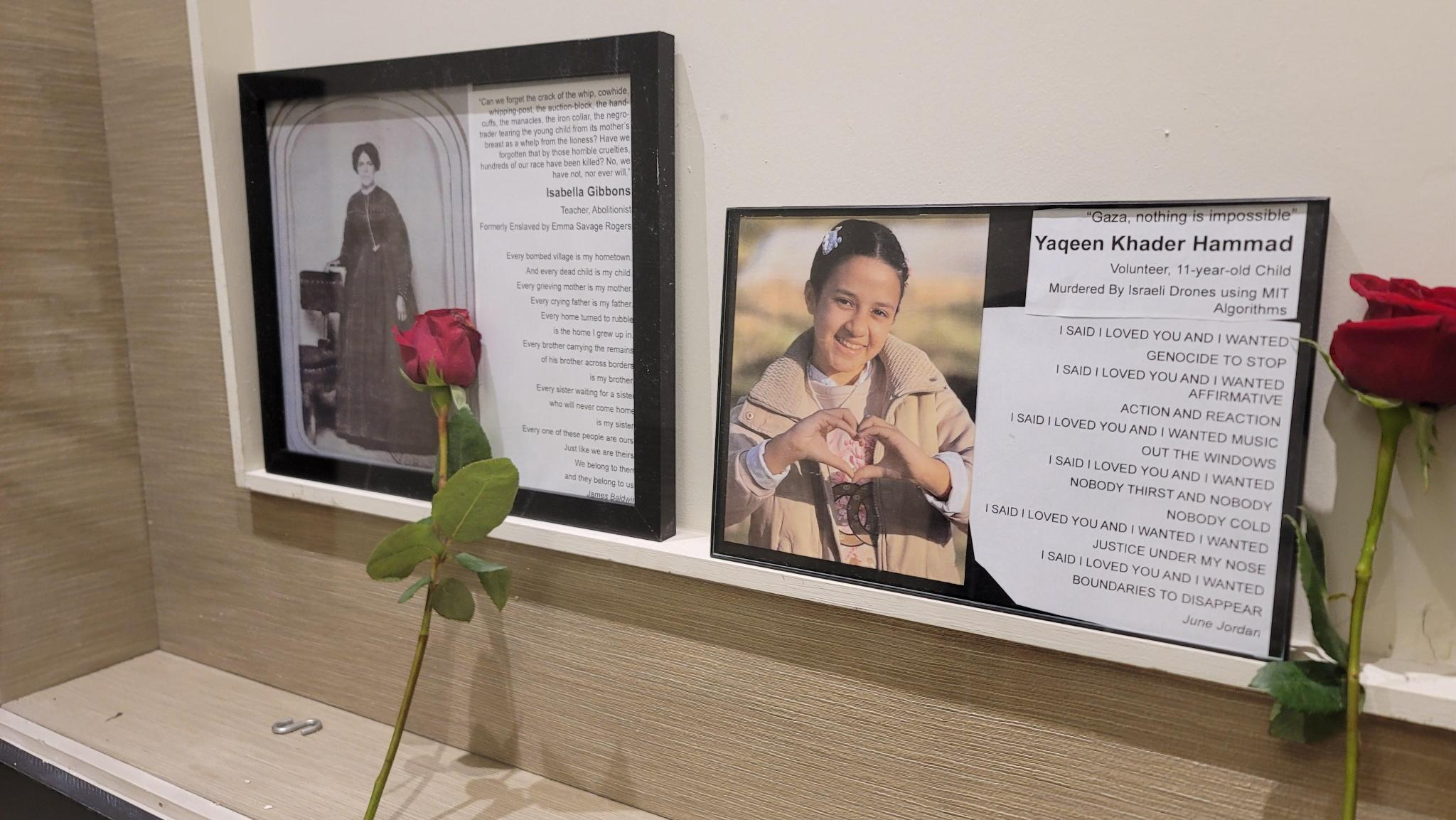
Memorial with roses and poems by James Baldwin and June Jordan, May 24, 2025.

== IHTFP ==
IHTFP is an abbreviation which is part of the folklore at the Massachusetts Institute of Technology. It originally stood for "I Hate This Fucking Place" but, due to use of profanity, is often euphemized with other backronyms. Some of the more popular meanings include "I Have The Fucking Power" (Hacking), "I Help Tutor Freshman Physics", "It's Hard To Fondle Penguins", "I'm Hankering To Find Paradise", and "Interesting Hacks To Fascinate People", as well as "I Have Truly Found Paradise", "Institute for Hacks, TomFoolery, and Pranks" and "Institute Has The Finest Professors". MIT leadership has even adapted the acronym, using it to encourage vaccination during the 2009–2010 flu season with a banner in the MIT medical building that read "I Hate This Flu Pandemic". The precise time of origin is unknown, though the term IHTFP was already widely used at MIT by 1960.

The letters "IHTFP" have been featured prominently on some hacks, but are more usually subtly embedded within other hacks as an inside joke. A very common motif in the MIT Brass Rat (class ring) prior to 2013 was the inclusion of the letters "IHTFP" hidden somewhere within the frame of the bezel.

The 2016 celebrations of MIT's "crossing of the Charles" in 1916, featured a translation as "I Honor Theory (and) Forgo Practice". This was part of a humorous sketch addressing friction between theoretical and applied researchers.

== Caltech rivalry ==
MIT and Caltech have been prank rivals since Spring 2005, when a group of Caltech students traveled to Cambridge to pull a string of pranks during "Campus Preview Weekend" (CPW) for prospective new MIT students. The stunts included covering up the word "Massachusetts" in the "Massachusetts Institute of Technology" engraving on the main building facade with a banner, so that it read "That Other Institute of Technology". A group of MIT hackers quickly responded by altering the banner so that the inscription read "The Only Institute of Technology".

MIT students retaliated for CPW in April 2006, when students posing as the "Howe & Ser Moving Co." abducted the 130-year-old, 1.7-ton Fleming House cannon and moved it to their campus in Cambridge, Massachusetts, thus reprising a similar prank performed by Harvey Mudd College in 1986. To add a technical flourish, a 24K gold-plated precisely upscaled machined replica of the famed Brass Rat (MIT's graduation ring) was tightly fitted over the barrel of the cannon, which was carefully aimed in the direction of Caltech. Twenty-three members of Caltech Fleming House traveled to MIT to reclaim their cannon on April 10, 2006. They were greeted by a larger group of MIT students, who offered them a BBQ farewell party. In exchange, the Caltech students offered a small toy cannon, saying that this was "more your size".

During MIT's CPW in 2007, Caltech distributed a complete fake edition of The Tech (MIT's student newspaper) with the headline article reading "MIT Invents the Interweb". Another article announced the discovery, "Infinite Corridor Not Actually Infinite", referring to MIT's iconic main thoroughfare. The edition included a mock weather forecast, referring often to how sunny Pasadena (where Caltech is located) is compared to Boston, as well as other satirical articles.

In 2008, Caltech students provided a "Puzzle Zero" in the MIT Mystery Hunt which when solved, told solvers to "CALL 1-626-848-3780 ASAP". When MIT students dialed the number, they heard, "Thank you for calling the Caltech Admissions Office. If you are another MIT student wishing to transfer to Caltech, please download our transfer application form from www.caltech.edu. If you are an MIT student not wishing to transfer to Caltech, we wish you the best of luck, and hope you find happiness someday...."

Around Thanksgiving weekend in 2009, yet another fake edition of The Tech was released, alleging that MIT had been sold to Caltech and would become "Caltech East: School of Humanities". Students would be required to take a core of literature, history, philosophy, and economics, but science subjects would be eliminated.

In the past few years, MIT hackers have tended to ignore Caltech "nuisance" pranks, instead preferring to perform more imaginatively engineered hacks on their own home campus. In particular, the majority of documented hacks occurring during CPW have been perpetrated by MIT students themselves. MIT hackers have only rarely interfered with Caltech traditions, rituals, or celebrations. But some MIT hackers do occasionally engage in low-level "sniping" back and forth with Caltech pranksters. For example, hackers made a website http://www.mitrejects.com redirect to Caltech's homepage. Caltech then did the same, with http://caltechrejects.com redirecting to the MIT homepage.

A possible change in attitude started when a TARDIS, which hackers had placed on the MIT Little Dome (August 25, 2010) and the MIT Great Dome (August 30, 2010), was transported to the roof of Baxter Hall at Caltech (January 4, 2011) by MIT and Caltech pranksters, where it remained for several weeks. The traveling time-machine subsequently reappeared atop Birge Hall at the University of California, Berkeley (January 29, 2011), and then rematerialized on the Durand Aeronautical and Astronautical Engineering Building at Stanford University (March 18, 2011). The TARDIS came complete with a helpful note explaining how to disassemble it, and suggesting passing it on to other unexplored destinations.

== Selected hacks ==
The MIT IHTFP Hack Gallery website has an extensive but far from complete catalog of past hacks related to MIT, including numerous documentary photos. More-complete coverage, especially of older hacks, appears in the books listed under Further Reading below, but these printed volumes appear only intermittently. The listing here only summarizes a few salient examples from MIT's long tradition of hacking.

=== The Great Dome ===
A fire truck on top of the Great Dome, September 11, 2006

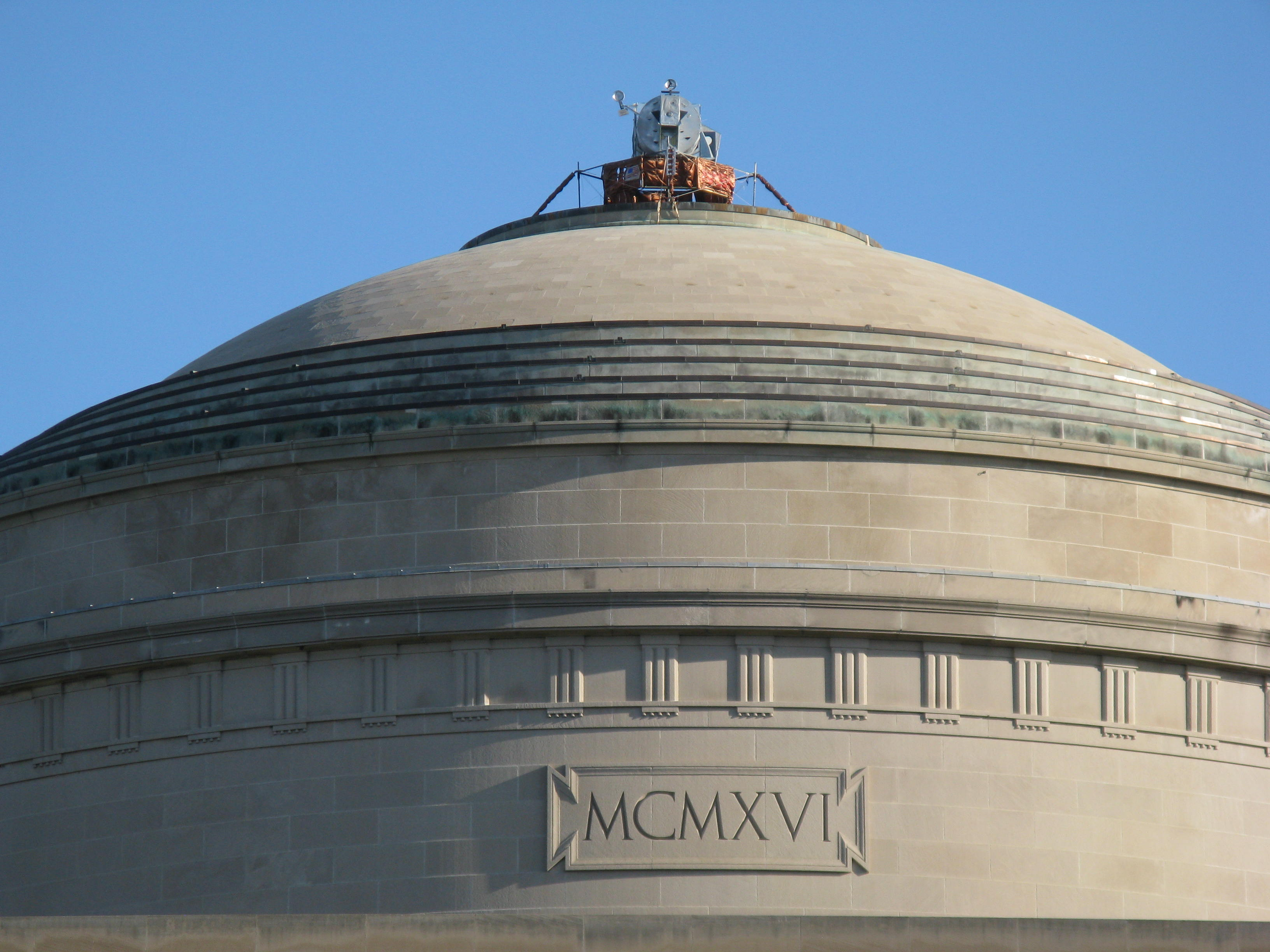
Celebration of the 40th Anniversary of Apollo 10 and the Lunar Module, May 19, 2009

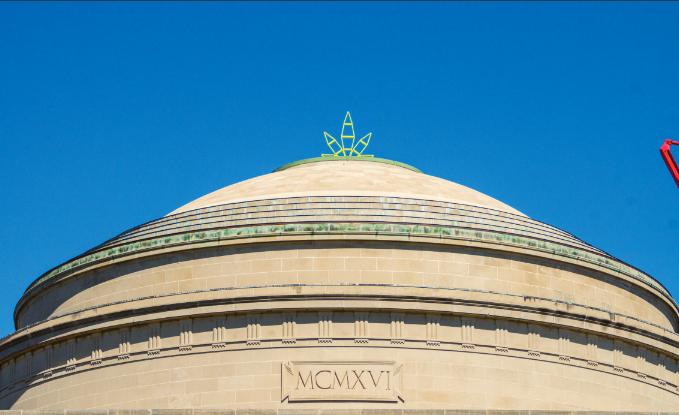
Students positioned a wooden leaf on MIT's Great Dome, April 20, 2016

Date	Hack	the point/notes
Apr 2019	Dome decorated as large Captain America's Shield	In honor of the release of the movie Avengers: Endgame, "dozens of people worked on the project for months, which they started planning about a year ago after learning a new Marvel movie was going to be released."
20 Apr 2016	Cannabis Leaf installed atop the Great Dome	In support of the legalization of cannabis in Massachusetts and in celebration of the cannabis-related international counterculture day, 4/20
10 Jan 2013	Pac-Man and Blinky appeared on the scaffolding covering the dome during reconstruction	Intended to serve as a metaphor for the semester. "Pac-Man represents the unquenchable search for knowledge, while Blinky represents the unforeseen distractions that may occur."
19 May 2009	Lunar Lander placed on dome	Celebration of the 40th Anniversary of Apollo 10 and the Lunar Module, May 19, 2009
Nov 2006	Triforce installed atop the Great Dome	In commemoration of the release of the video game The Legend of Zelda: Twilight Princess.
11 Sep 2006	Full-size "MIT Fire Department" fire truck placed Dome	Presumed to commemorate the fifth anniversary of the September 11, 2001 attacks. The logo painted on the truck's sides featured the two figures from the MIT seal dressed as firemen, along with the motto MEMINIMUS ("We remember").
28 Feb 2006	Torino Olympic medal placed on dome	In honor of the Torino, Italy, Winter Olympics.
16 Jul 2007	Dome "scarred" with Harry Potter's lightning bolt scar	To celebrate the release of Harry Potter and the Deathly Hallows.
17 Dec 2003	A replica of the first Wright brothers airplane, the Wright Flyer, was placed on the Great Dome	In honor of the 100th anniversary of their first powered flight.
9 May 1994	A car painted as an MIT Campus Police car appeared on top of the Great Dome.	This hack gained recognition on many local news sources and on national television, and is widely celebrated for its realism, attention to detail, and humor.
31 Oct 1979	A lifesize plastic cow appeared on top of the Great Dome (Alpha Tau Omega).	The cow and a photo of two students (Mike Heaney '81 and Aaron Bobick '81) hauling it up to the dome were later installed by the MIT Museum in the Stata Center.

=== Whimsical ===
Date	Hack	the point/notes
27 Oct, 2012	MIT Gangnam Style parody video	Although it might not strictly be categorized as a hack, the MIT Gangnam Style parody video released October 27, 2012, was a major student-run project that involved coordinating hundreds of people and over 25 different student organizations. The music video closely follows the original version, and includes cameo appearances by MIT professors Donald Sadoway, recognized by Time magazine in 2012 as one of the "Top 100 Most Influential People in the World", Eric Lander, who was co-chairman of President Barack Obama's Council of Advisors on Science and Technology, and Noam Chomsky, a pioneer of modern linguistics. The parody quickly reached #1 most popular video in Entertainment and #6 overall on YouTube, was called the "Best Gangnam Style Parody Yet" by The Huffington Post, and got an enthusiastic reaction from Psy, the star and producer of the original video.
15 Sep 2004	Vannevar Shrubbery Room	A small alcove in the Infinite Corridor was closed off by a painted wall with a door. Opening the door revealed a "room" inside, full of small shrubs or bushes, plus some painted and framed artwork. An official-looking sign next to the door labeled it the "Vannevar Shrubbery Room", a parody of the nearby larger "Vannevar Bush Room", whose entrance location had recently been moved around the corner due to renovations.
23 Apr 2003	Athena cluster gnome invasion	Hundreds of garden gnomes of various shapes and sizes appeared in and around the W20 Student Center Athena cluster.
7 June 1996	Buzzword Bingo	During a speech made by Vice-President Al Gore at the graduation ceremony, the graduates played Buzzword bingo using cards which had been distributed by hackers. The cards featured technical words which students believed were overused by people outside the technical professions, such as "Information Superhighway". Gore, who was informed of the hack, acknowledged it during his speech.

=== Technical ===
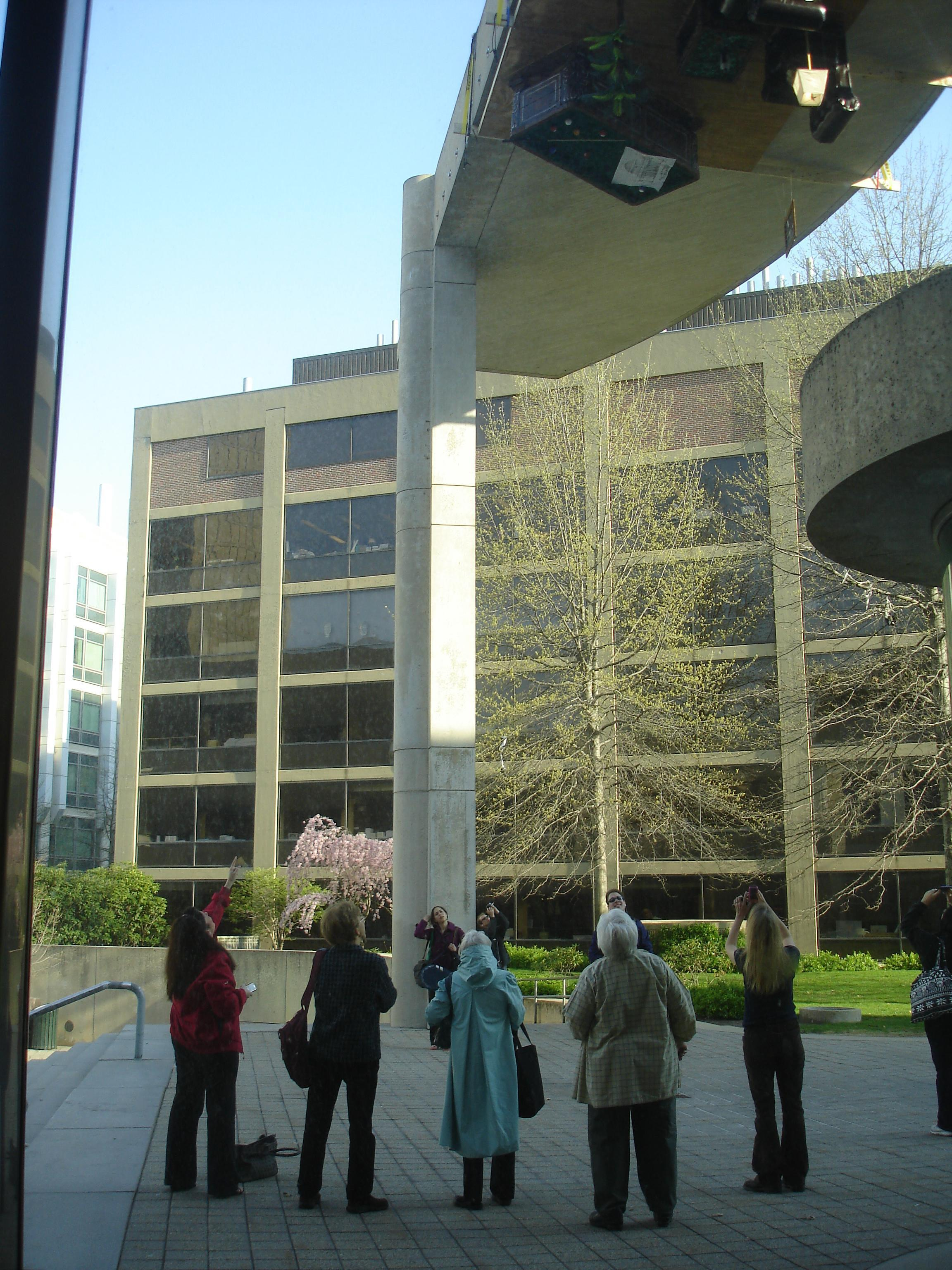
A full living room set hung inverted outside the MIT Media Lab in April 2010; it included an imitation stuffed cat curled in a chair, illustration of the MIT dome, and a floor lamp with the light left on.

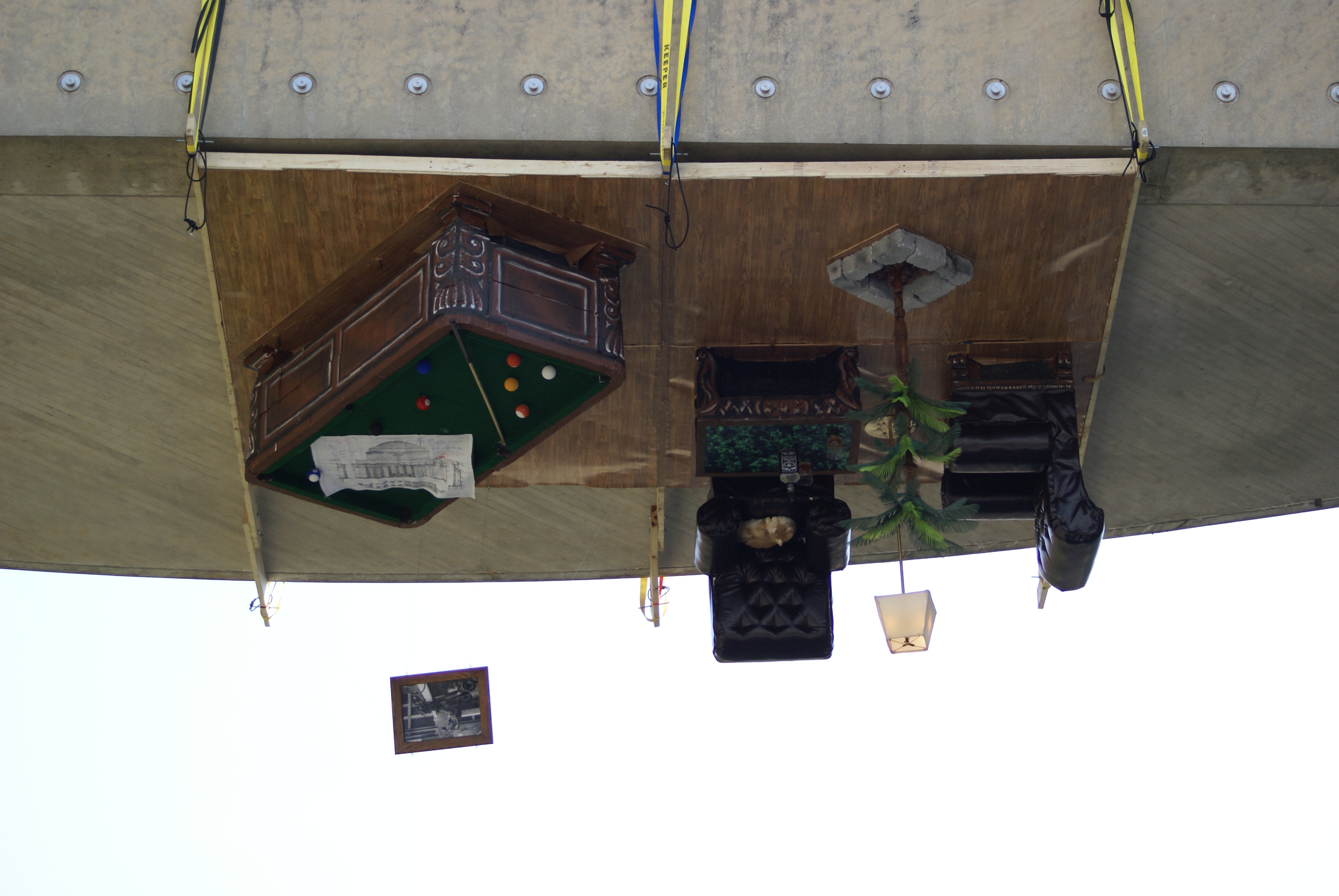
Closeup of inverted living room hack

Date	Hack	the point/notes
19 Oct 2026	A large Newton's Cradle with themed MIT symbols was hung outside the MIT Media Lab	The symbols included the MIT logo and a variety of logos from student groups, including Random Hall and East Campus floors.
Apr 2010	A full living room set hung inverted outside the MIT Media Lab	Complete with chairs, functional "floor lamp", and a properly set up billiards table, ready for play.
Oct 2007	"GO SOX!" banner across the 1,000+ foot (300+ m) span between the MacGregor House Dormitory and Tang Graduate Dormitory towers	To cheer on the Boston Red Sox during the 2007 World Series.
Sep 2006	Part of the side of Simmons Hall was turned into a giant blue LED display.	This project, implemented with under $150 of components, was funded by the Simmons Rush budget.
9 Dec 1991	Fire hose and Hydrant Installation	It has been often said that "Getting an Education from MIT is like taking a drink from a Fire Hose", inspiring hackers to connect a real fire hose and a concrete-embedded fire hydrant to a drinking fountain in Building 16. Years later, the iconic monument was semi-permanently re-installed by the MIT Museum in the Stata Center.
31 Oct 1979	A lifesize plastic cow appeared on top of the Great Dome (Alpha Tau Omega).	The cow and a photo of two students (Mike Heaney '81 and Aaron Bobick '81) hauling it up to the dome were later installed by the MIT Museum in the Stata Center.

=== College Prank ===
Date	Hack	the point/notes
Sep 2007	John Harvard statue in Harvard Yard with a Halo MJOLNIR armor helmet and assault rifle	To commemorate the release of Halo 3.
Aug 2006	Rubber Duck invasion Simmons Hall poster campaigne at Caltech	A welcome back poster and a few dozen rubber ducks in the name of Simmons Hall at MIT appeared on the Caltech campus in mid-August. They were accompanied by posters that presented proposed renovations to add Simmons-like architectural elements (particularly the ones often regarded as useless by MIT students) to Caltech dormitories, which were undergoing renovation.
Apr 2006	"Howe & Ser Moving Co." Caltech visit	A 130-year-old, 1.7 ton cannon was moved from Caltech to MIT via a fake moving company "Howe & Ser Moving Co." This marked the 20th anniversary of when 11 students from nearby Harvey Mudd College removed the cannon from the front of the Fleming House. This time, the cannon was situated in a prominent place on the MIT campus in front of the Green Building and was adorned with a unique Brass Rat. It was symbolically pointed at its previous owner, Caltech. Twenty to thirty members of Fleming House later traveled to MIT and reclaimed their cannon on April 10, 2006. They left a toy cannon with the note, "Here's something more your size.":
1 Apr 1998	Disney buys MIT	As an April Fool's Day prank, the MIT home page was replaced with a page announcing the university had been bought by The Walt Disney Company for $6.9 billion. The hacked page showed a picture of Mickey Mouse ears atop the Great Dome, and replaced the letter I in MIT with the lower-case "i" from Disney's wordmark. It even contained a fake press release with statements purportedly from Disney and MIT officials, detailing terms of the acquisition.

=== Historical ===
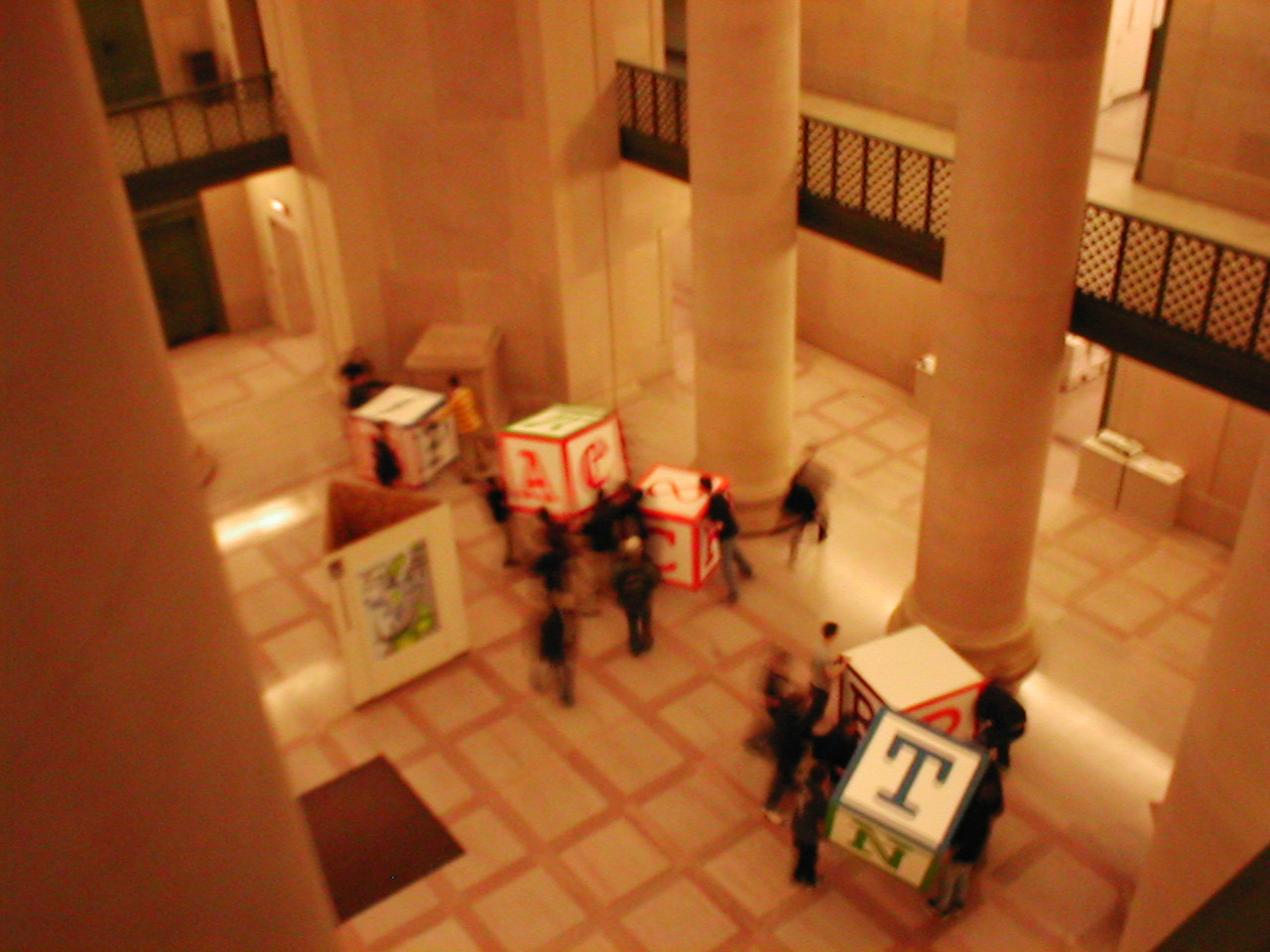
A hack in progress in Lobby 7, in 2003

Date	Hack	the point/notes
Nov 1963	The first recorded reference to malicious hacking	The first ever reference to malicious hacking is "telephone hackers" in MIT's student newspaper, The Tech, of hackers tying up the cross-connect lines with Harvard, configuring a PDP-1 to make free calls, war dialing, and accumulating large phone bills.
Oct 1958	Construction of the Smoot Bridge markers	Oliver R. Smoot, a pledge of MIT's Lambda Chi Alpha fraternity in 1958, was used to measure the length of the Harvard Bridge. As he lay on the sidewalk of the bridge that carries Massachusetts Avenue across the Charles River, markings were made at intervals corresponding to his height. The bridge was measured to be 364.4 Smoots (plus or minus one ear) in length. During renovation of the bridge in 1964 the markings were carefully restored, and the markings are still carefully maintained today.
1930s	Streetcar/thermite bomb incident	Ken Wadleigh (who later in life became a dean at MIT) and 4 others welded a streetcar to its metal rails by first distracting the motorman and then setting off small thermite bombs to fuse the wheels into place.

== Accidents ==
In the early morning of April 26, 2017, recent computer science graduate Nicholas William Paggi died while hacking the Great Dome, when he slipped and fell to his death.

== See also ==
- Campus of the Massachusetts Institute of Technology
- Hacker (programmer subculture)
- Hacker (term)
- Hacker ethic
- Guerrilla art
- List of practical joke topics
- Roof and tunnel hacking
- Tech Model Railroad Club
