= Infinite Corridor =

Hallway at the Massachusetts Institute of Technology

Coordinates: 42.3594°N 71.0925°W

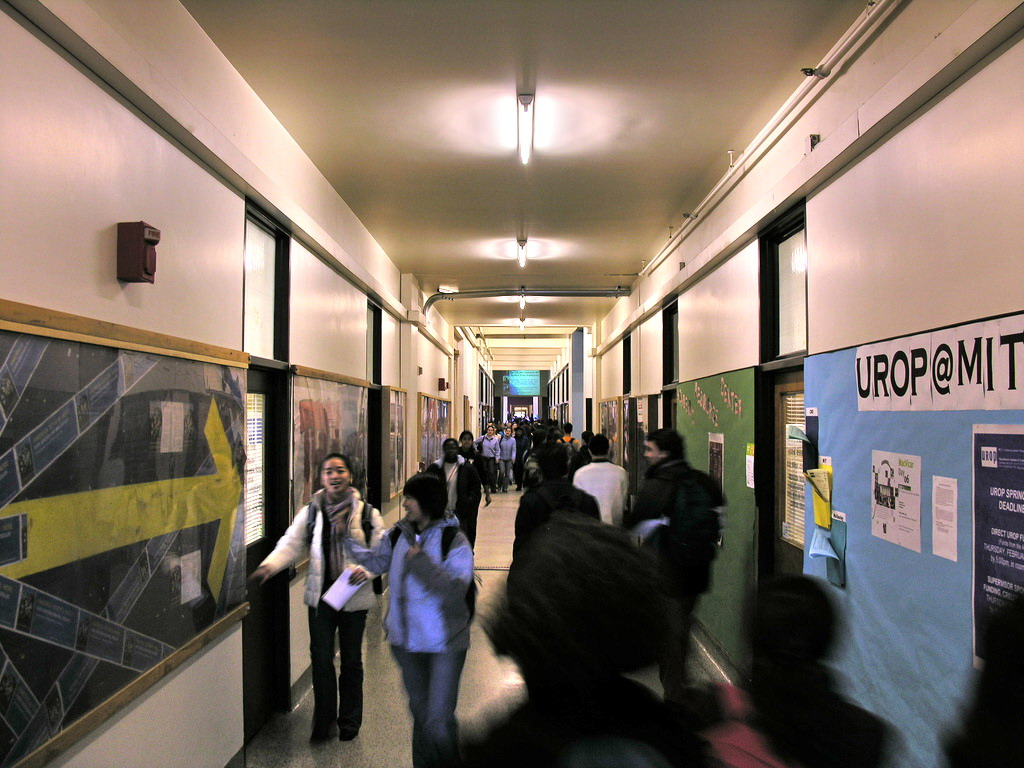
The Infinite Corridor is the main pedestrian thoroughfare at MIT (February 2006)

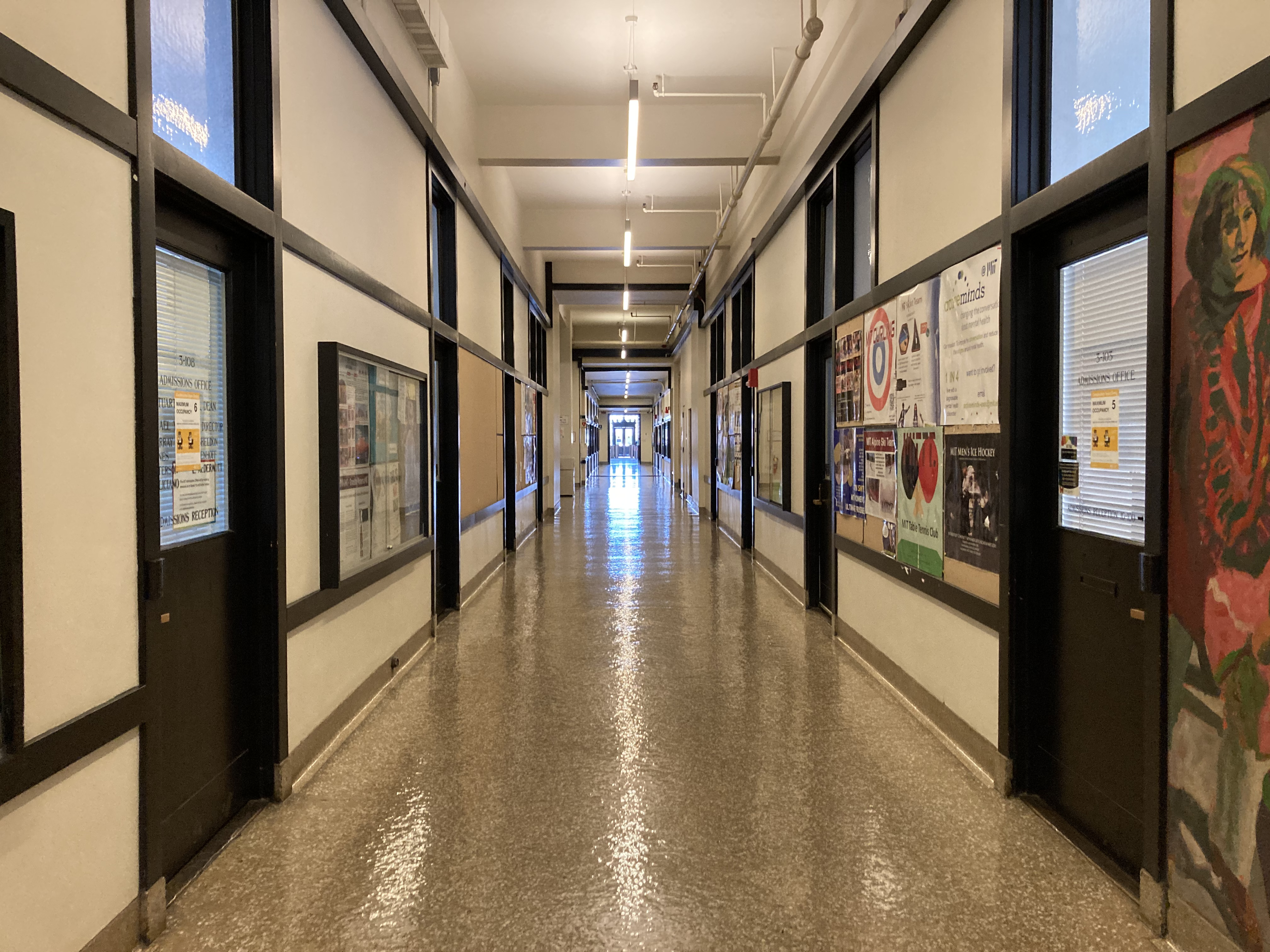
Empty Infinite Corridor during COVID-19 lockdown (March 2021)

The Infinite Corridor is a 251-meter (823 ft) hallway that runs through the main buildings of the Massachusetts Institute of Technology, specifically parts of the buildings numbered 7, 3, 10, 4, and 8 (from west to east).

Twice a year, in mid-November and in late January, the corridor lines up lengthwise with the position of the Sun, causing sunlight to fill the entire corridor. Named MIThenge, the event is celebrated by students, faculty, and staff.

== Significance ==
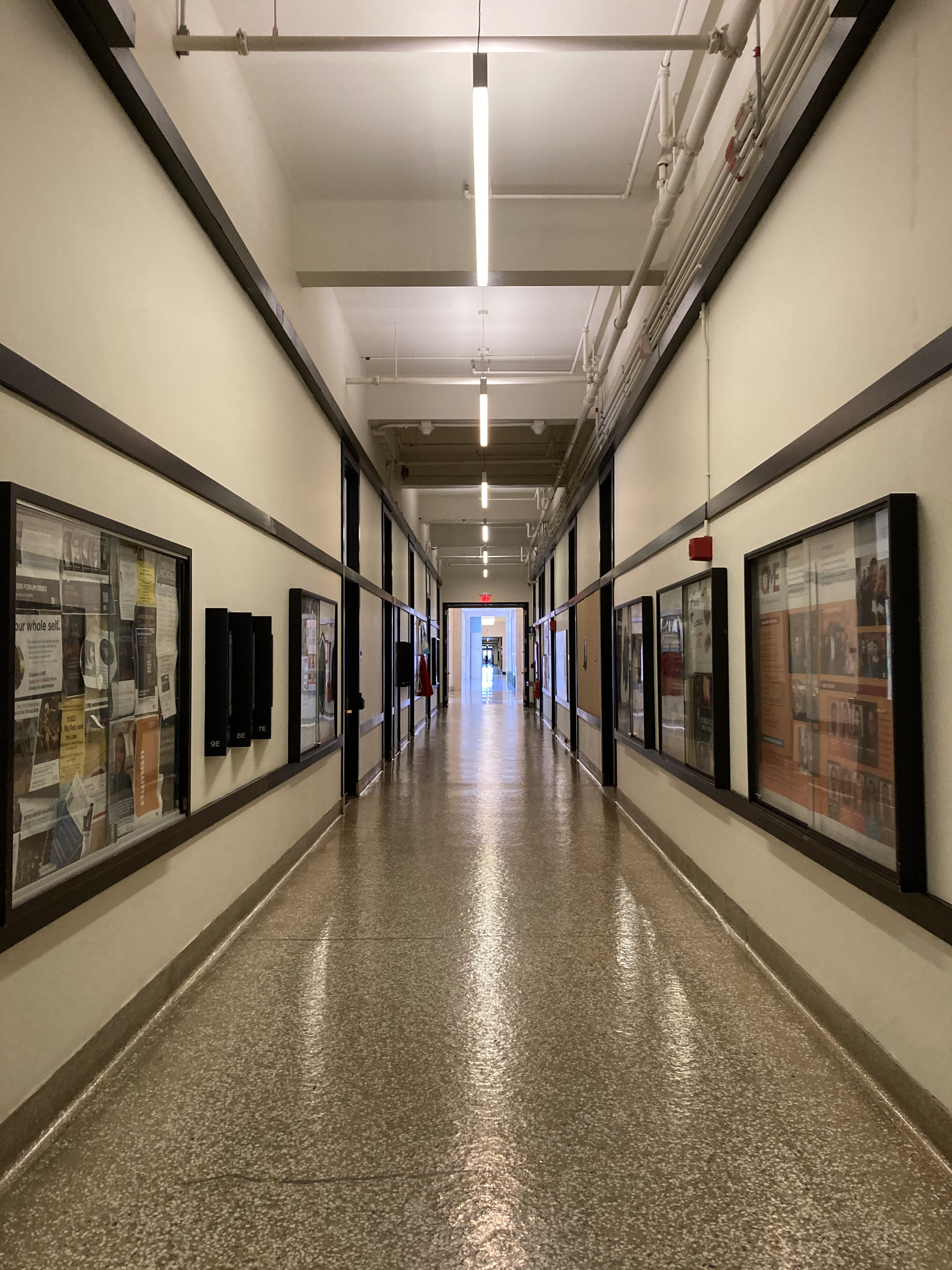
Glass-enclosed historic displays

The corridor is important not only because it links major MIT buildings, but also because it serves as the most direct indoor route between the east and west ends of the campus. The corridor was designed as the central spine of the original set of MIT buildings designed by William W. Bosworth in 1913.

The Infinite Corridor is slightly longer than that of the University Hall building at the University of Lethbridge, Alberta, Canada, which measures 800 feet (240 m) long. It is, however, significantly shorter than the so called "K-Straße" (K-street) in the Rost-/Silberlaube building of the Free University of Berlin, which measures about 320 metres (1,050 ft).

== Etiquette ==
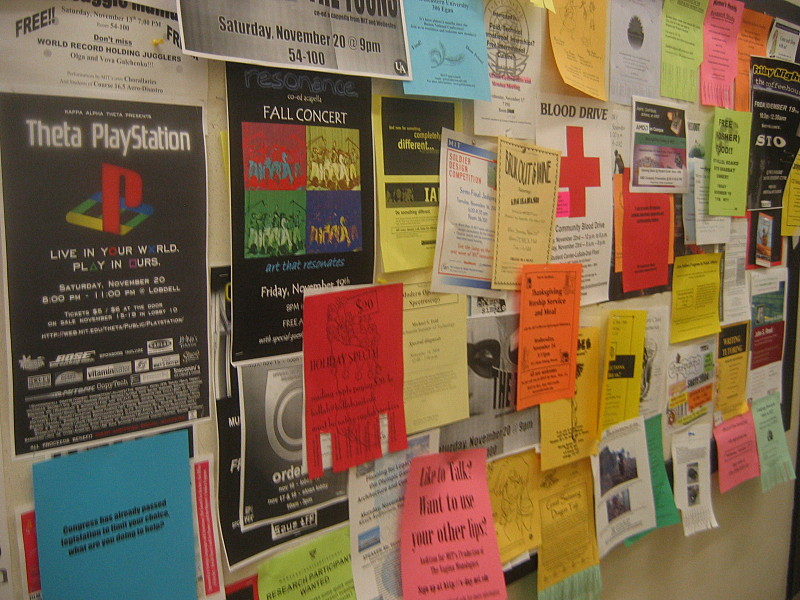
Unenclosed bulletin boards rapidly accumulate many posters

On occasion, students in the Transport Lab of the Department of Civil and Environmental Engineering (CEE) have studied foot traffic in the Infinite Corridor, as a safer, more accessible model of highway traffic. In 1997, one student report made the following observations about the informal rules that seem to apply to Infinite Corridor traffic:

The rules of the road for the Infinite Corridor include: stay to the right, limit group size, pass on the left, form a line at bottlenecks, don't stop/slow down, no tailgating, traffic within corridor has right of way, no physical contact and no eye contact.

== Hacks ==
Because the heavy pedestrian traffic in the Infinite Corridor guarantees a large audience, it is a setting for some "hacks" (practical jokes), especially those of a serial nature such as a series of "Burma Shave" style signs. The "Mass Toolpike" hack in 1985 involved placing traffic signals, lane markings, and highway-like signs along the length of the Infinite Corridor. A 2014 April Fools' Day post from the Alumni Association blog Slice of MIT suggested that the corridor floor would be replaced with a self-powering moving walkway made of piezoelectric tiles.

== Geography ==
=== Entrance ===
An outside grand stairway leads up from Massachusetts Avenue to Lobby 7, the main entrance to the Infinite Corridor. This location is often called "77 MassAve", an abbreviation of its official street address; the street itself forms the western boundary of the main or central campus. The MIT Student Center (Building W20) is located directly across the street, at 84 Massachusetts Avenue.

Nearby bus stops serve MBTA buses from Harvard Square, and from Back Bay across the Charles River via the Harvard Bridge, as well as various shuttle buses. Food vendor trucks often park in designated spaces near the entrance.

=== Lobby 7 ===
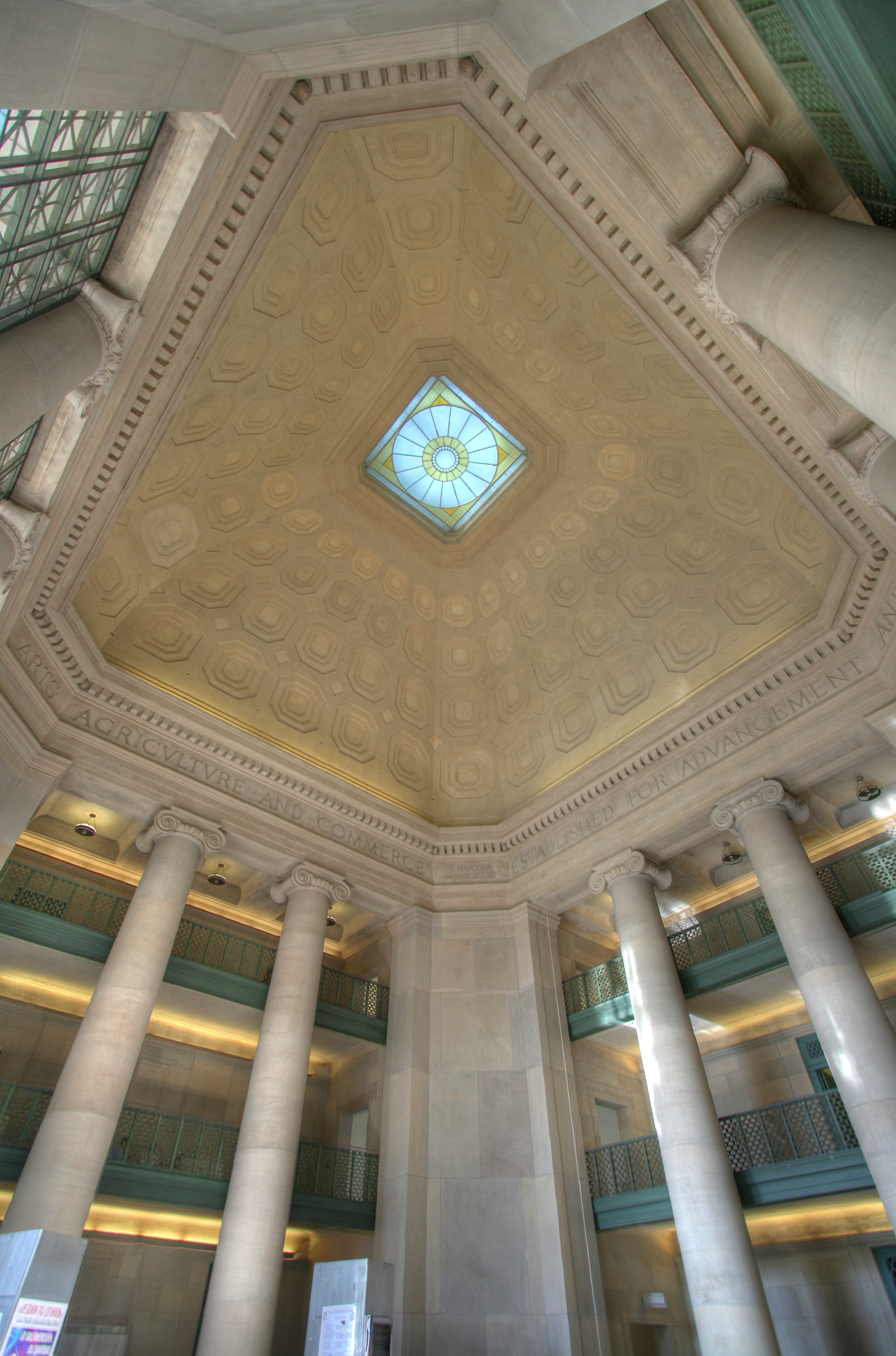
MIT Lobby 7, viewed looking up at the interior of the Little Dome

Lobby 7, so named because of its location in Building 7 (formally named the Rogers Building), is a large 100-foot (30 m) vertical space open all the way up to the interior of the Little Dome. A carved inscription circles the space just below the base of the Little Dome. Four empty pedestals occupy the corners of the square lobby; they were originally intended for large Neoclassical figural sculptures, but are instead often occupied by students studying, or occasionally playing live music. The Infinite Corridor begins straight ahead through the lobby, on the opposite side from the street.

During the 1970s, two large pillars flanking the entrance to the Infinite Corridor were partially wrapped in paper and used by the liberal "Alternative Advertising" and somewhat less liberal "Pillar Productions" where students would scrawl responses to issues of the day such as nuclear power or whether disco sucked. A display of Air Force art was once withdrawn after vandalism in the lobby.

Lobby 7 is frequently used for formally scheduled or impromptu concerts, as well as dance performances. Occasionally, "performance art" hacks or installation art hacks are sited in Lobby 7. Banners advertising campus events are often hung from the upper levels of Lobby 7, including the occasional hack banner such as "Don't let the Grinch steal your Christmas" (in reference to complaints about the campus Christmas tree). The cavernous interior space of Lobby 7 is frequently the site of hacks that require a large volume of unobstructed indoor space.

=== Memorial Lobby (Lobby 10) ===
A two-story atrium space at the half-way point of the corridor, informally known as Lobby 10, is part of the MacLaurin Buildings in Building 10, underneath the Great Dome. In this space, it is quite common to find several booths or tables advertising upcoming events, or students engaged in other public activities and demonstrations, such as juggling or dancing. Often, there are fund-raising activities, such as selling used books, tickets for shows or concerts, artworks made in the MIT GlassLab or Student Art Association, or Chinese pastries and other snacks.

At a ceremony on November 18, 2013, the space was formally rededicated as Memorial Lobby. The travertine walls bear the engraved names of MIT alumni who died in each of several wars, and these inscriptions have been re-gilded to make them more readable.

=== Different levels ===
The Infinite Corridor has five levels: the basement, and floors 1 through 4. Elevators in Lobby 7 and in Lobby 10 provide access to each floor, as do numerous stairways. The elevators in Lobby 10 also provide access to the Barker Engineering Library, via the 5th floor. In accordance with its US location, MIT buildings usually use the American floor numbering scheme.

The first floor (called the "ground floor" by some) is the most traveled level, and is often the only one referred to as the Infinite Corridor. It is most of a floor above ground level at Massachusetts Avenue (the west end, Building 7), and in areas is a full floor up, with a parking lot entrance passing underneath (this entrance crosses the basement-level corridor at grade between Buildings 7 and 3). At its east end in Building 8, it is also about half a floor up. The Basement Infinite Corridor mirrors the first floor passage, but connects to the extensive below-grade system of tunnels connecting many buildings.

== Displays ==
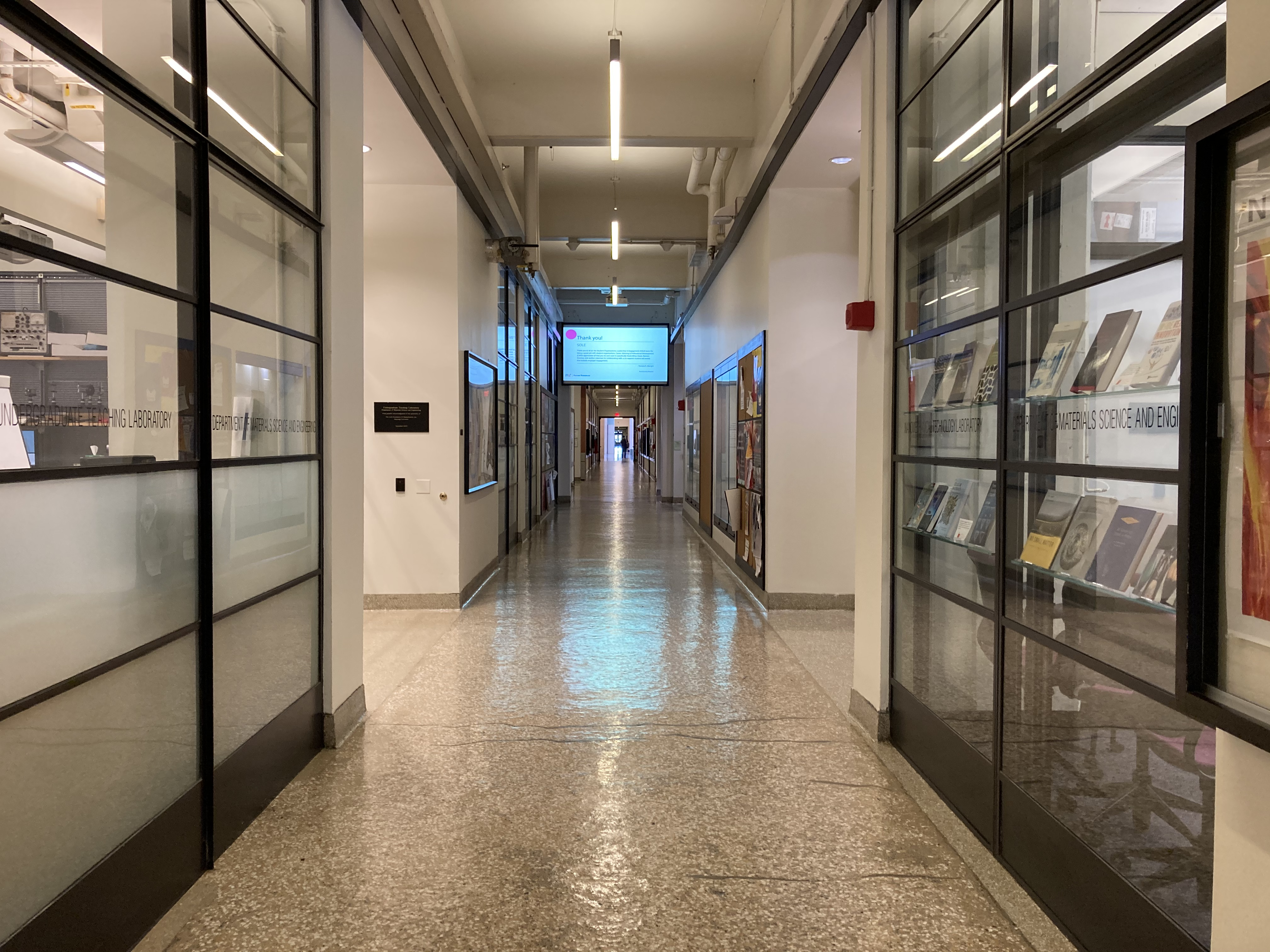
Glass-walled labs adjacent to the Infinite Corridor, showcasing recent faculty and student publications

The walls lining the Infinite Corridor were painted stark "Institute Gray" with black doorway trim until Spring 1970, when a number of wall murals appeared. With two notable exceptions, the paintings were soon replaced by bulletin boards and enclosed display cases which remained largely unchanged for several decades. A summer 2010 renovation installed more-durable boards, and more clearly marked many portions of them as reserved for exclusive use by one specified student activity or another.

The Cashier's Office wall was painted as a giant dollar bill for over 25 years (and was itself the subject of a number of non-destructive hacks). The mural was eventually removed and replaced with a glass wall when the space behind it was converted to a community lounge. A picture of the old wall mural is etched into the glass, as a historical marker. The oldest remaining wall mural (near the former location of the Admissions Office) is an early-1970s style colorful painting of a "multicultural" group of people walking quickly, painted by Andrea H. Pritchard, wife of Physics Professor David E. Pritchard. Having survived many renovations and repaintings of the Infinite Corridor, the mural now is a carefully preserved relic of that era.

Some adjacent laboratories, notably those of the Department of Materials Science and Engineering (DMSE, Course 3), now have floor-to-ceiling glass walls and large posters or display cases explaining some of their research activities and course offerings. This is a natural result of the DMSE's facilities location surrounding the eastern end of the Infinite Corridor.

== MIT's Infinite Solar System model ==
In 2018, MIT professor Richard Binzel installed a 1:30,000,000,000 ratio Solar System model along 200 m of the Infinite Corridor at the third floor level. Each full-color plaque shows the to-scale size of a planet, along with an enlarged image and some basic data. At the scale of the model, the speed of light reduces to 1 cm/s, so that by walking normally, a viewer can attain warp speed, exceeding the cosmic speed limit. In addition to a printed brochure, a free online self-guided tour is available.

== MIThenge ==
Observers awaiting MIThenge, November 2019

On several days each year, the Sun sets in alignment with the Infinite Corridor and shines along its entire length. This is known as "MIThenge", a reference to Stonehenge's alignment with the Sun (although the type of alignment bears a closer relationship with that of Newgrange and Maeshowe in that the sunlight passes through the mass of the buildings rather than through the standing stones of Stonehenge). These alignments occur on several days around January 31 and November 11. The phenomenon was spotted, calculated, and popularized in 1975–76 according to a Sky and Telescope article; the naming convention follows that coined for Manhattanhenge.

A less-known alignment with the Moon also occurs, but it is more subtle and more difficult to observe. Although it occurs in alignment with the corridor during the summertime months, the sunrise cannot be observed then, due to visual obstructions at the eastern end of the Infinite Corridor.

A campus newspaper, The Tech, has published etiquette and viewing suggestions for first-time observers. Several online videos offer different perspectives on the phenomenon and on the observers.

MIThenge January 2022
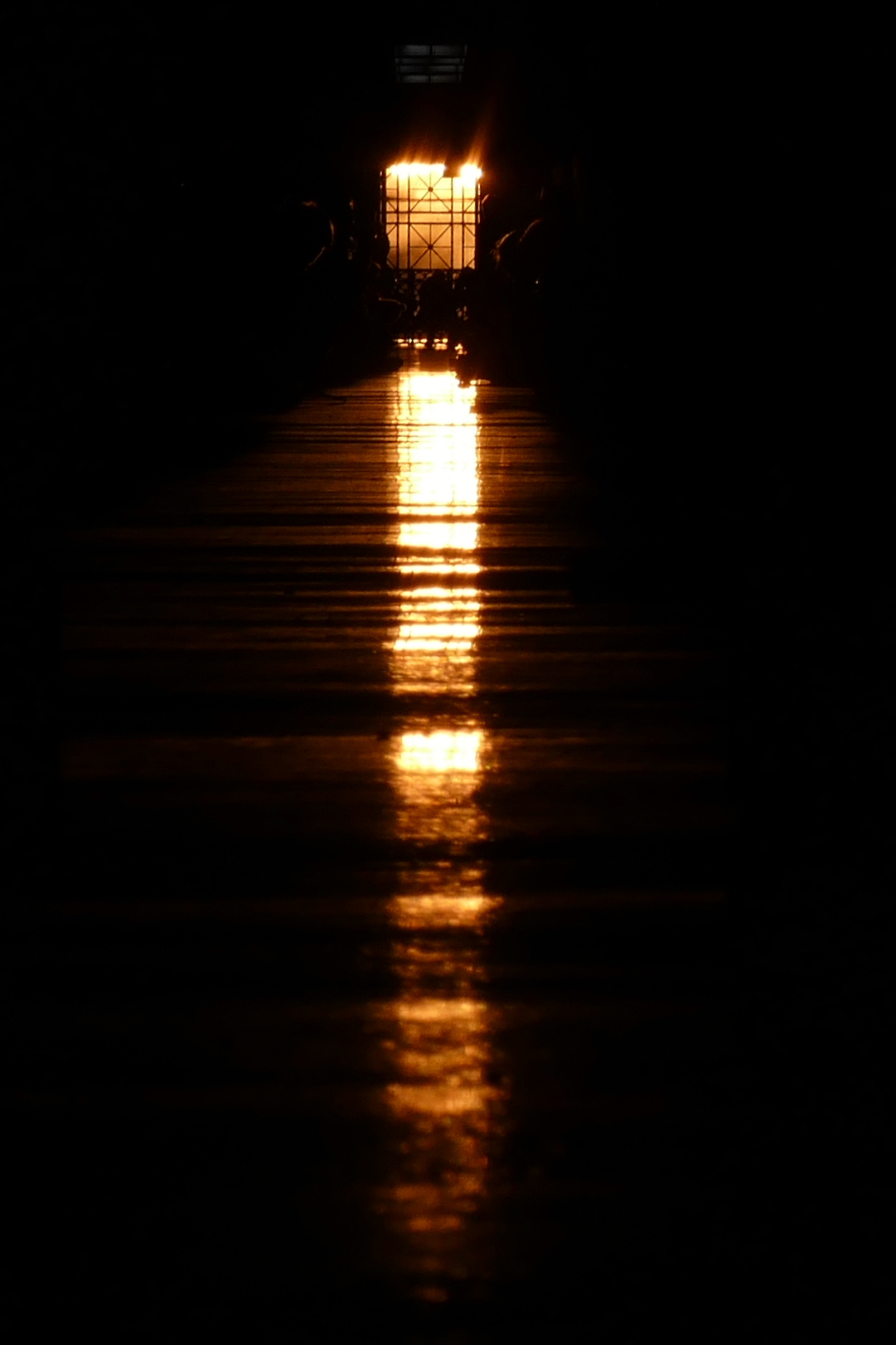
Unobstructed view

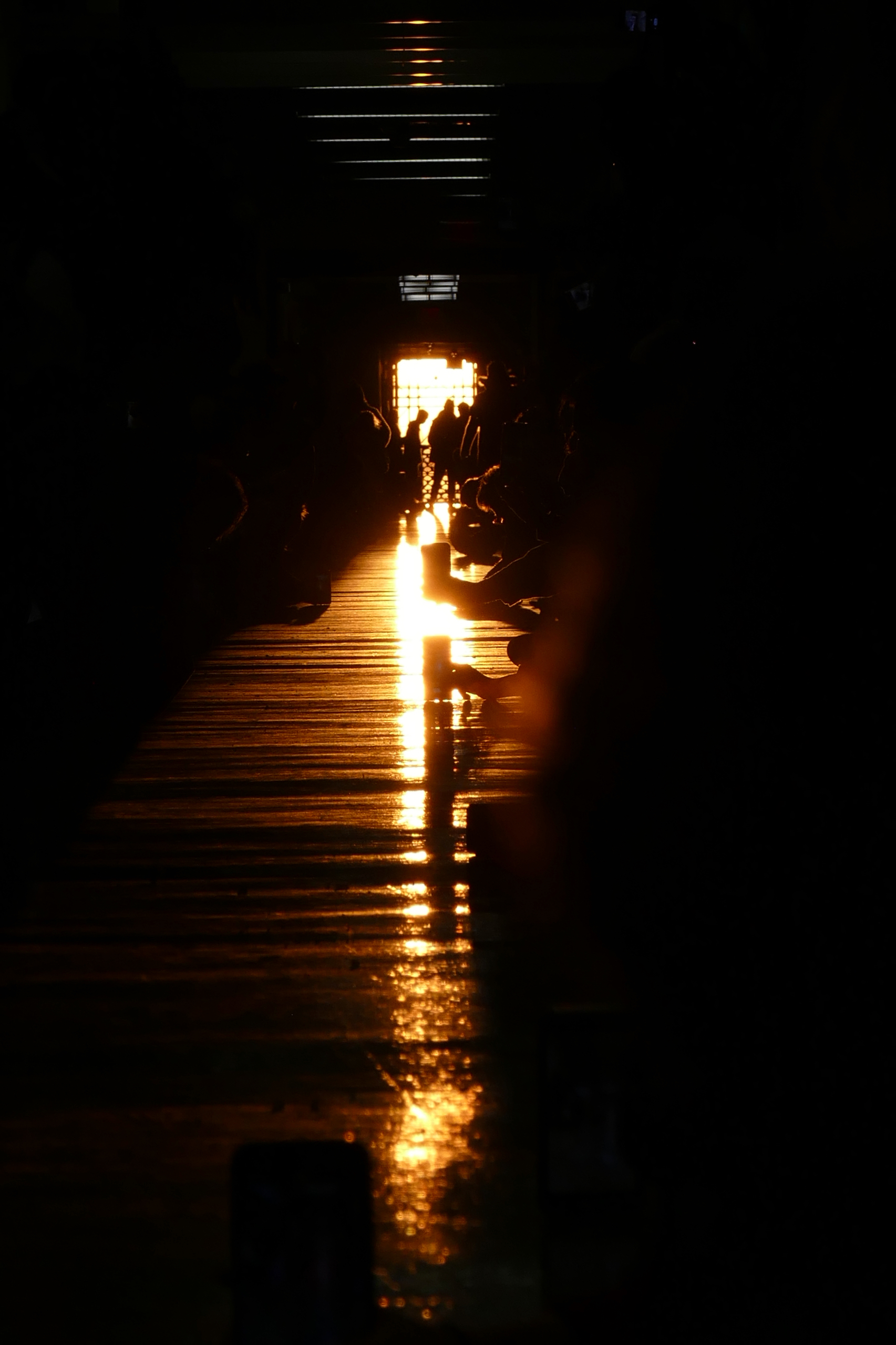
Crowded corridor

== Demonstrations ==
During the 1960s, a common Technology Day demonstration used the unobstructed length of the corridor to demonstrate the speed of light in a simple, direct way. A strobe light, photocell, and oscilloscope were positioned at one end of the corridor, and a mirror at the other. The round-trip time is about 1.67 microseconds. The photocell picked up both the direct and reflected flashes. The flash duration being well under a microsecond, the result was two nicely separated pulses on the oscilloscope screen, which could be measured to compute the speed.
