= Killian Court =

Open court in MIT, Massachusetts, U.S.

Coordinates: 42.35877°N 71.09148°W

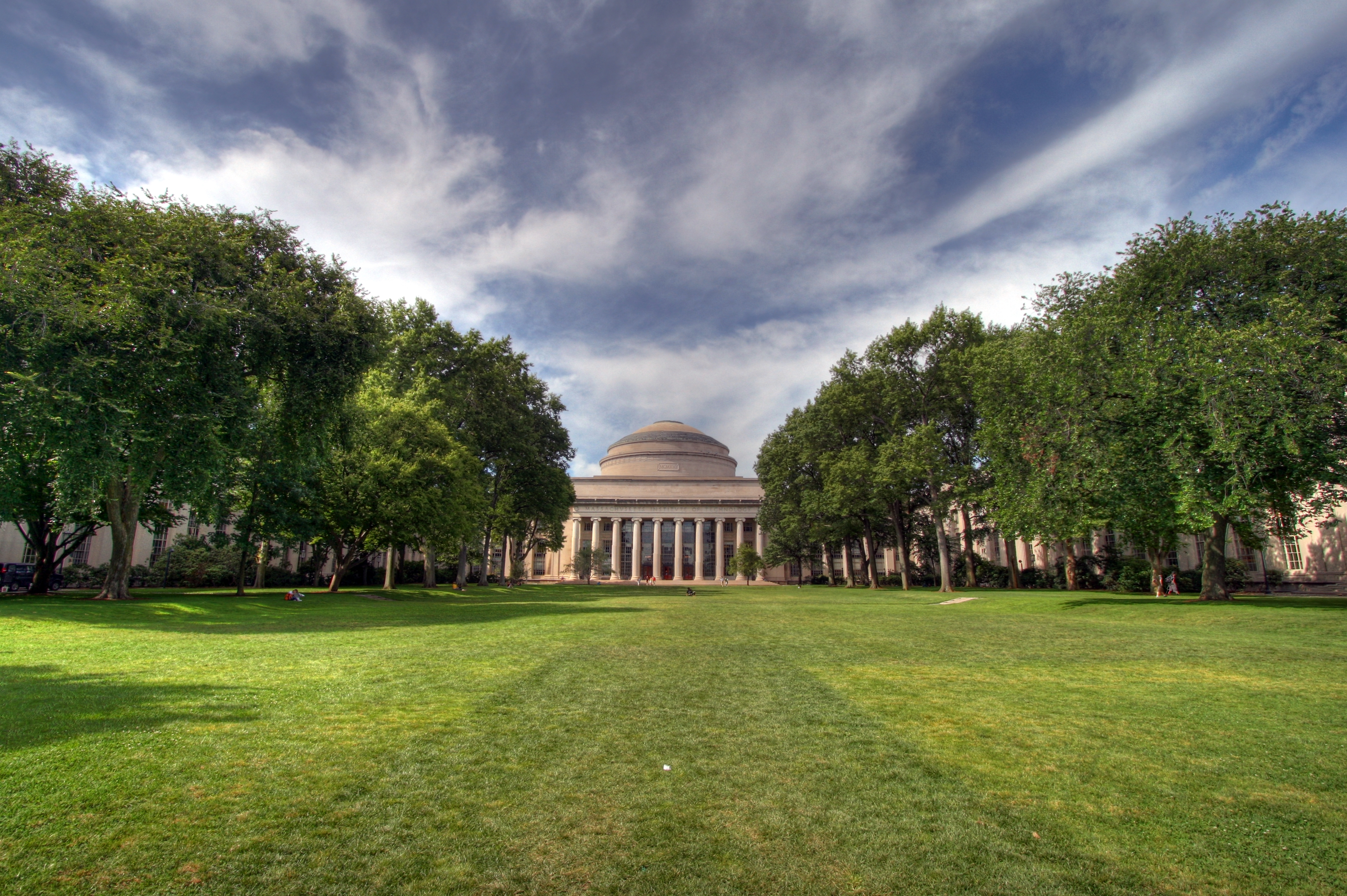
- The court in 2008
- Interactive map of the Killian Court area

General information
- Location: Cambridge, Massachusetts, U.S.

Killian Court is part of the Massachusetts Institute of Technology campus, in Cambridge, Massachusetts, United States.

== History ==
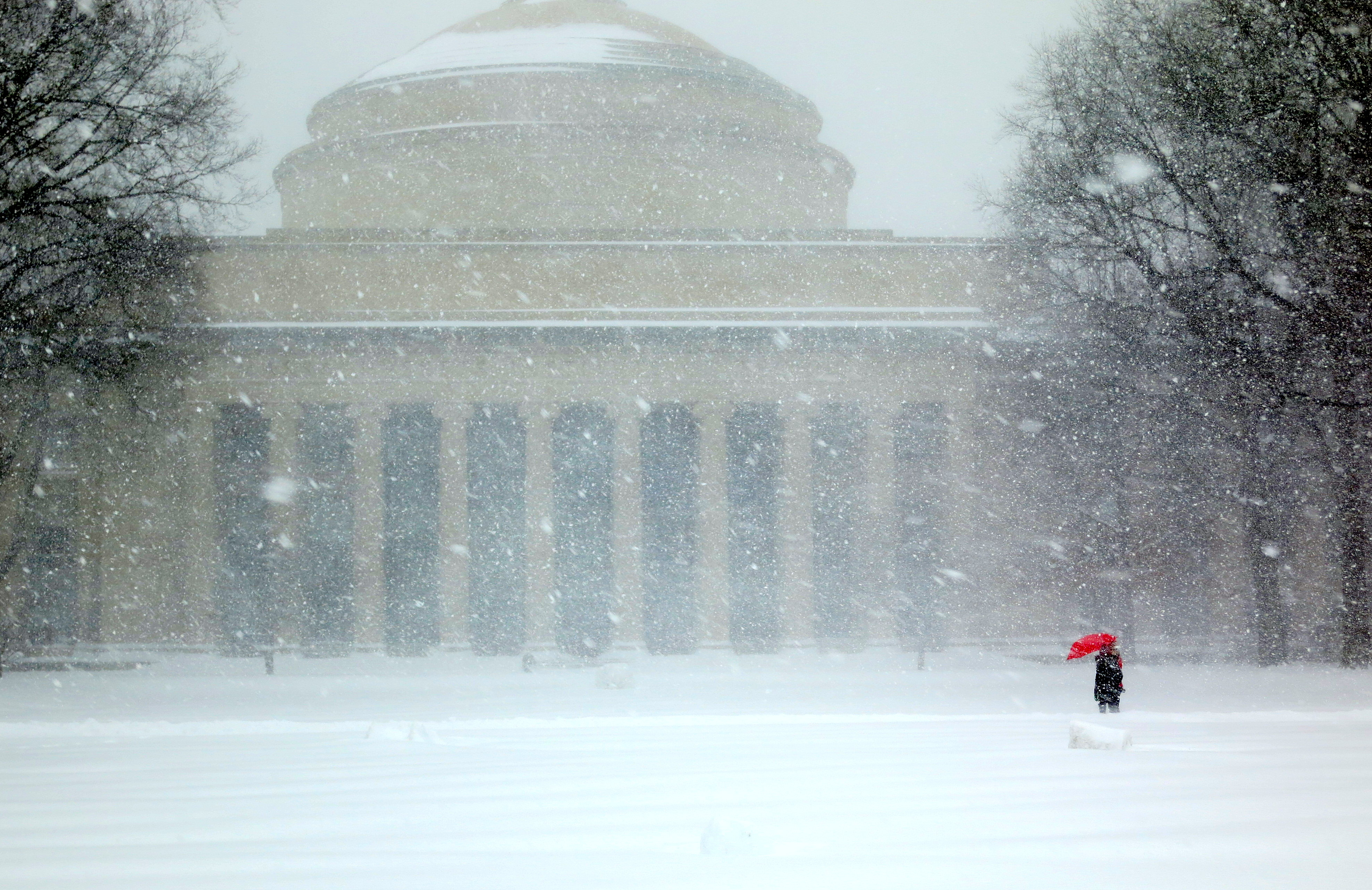
The court during a blizzard in 2015

Campus designer William W. Bosworth's plan rejected the prevailing conventions of separated buildings and retreat from the urban area, as was found in other new American campuses. The Great Court, renamed Killian Court in 1974 after President James Rhyne Killian, faces the river and the Boston skyline and "emphasizes the institution's openness to the urban environment and fulfills Maclaurin's ambition." Killian Court was originally hard-paved, but was converted into a park-like area of grass and trees in the late 1920s. Bosworth had planned to install a three-story-high statue of Minerva at the center of the court, but funds for this embellishment were never appropriated. Today, Killian Court is the site of the annual Commencement ceremony.

== Features ==
The friezes of the marble-clad buildings surrounding Killian Court are carved in large Roman letters with the names of Aristotle, Newton, Franklin, Pastevr, Lavoisier, Faraday, Archimedes, da Vinci, Darwin, and Copernicvs; each of these names is surmounted by a cluster of appropriately related names in smaller letters. Lavoisier, for example, is placed in the company of Boyle, Cavendish, Priestley, Dalton, Gay-Lussac, Berzelivs, Woehler, Liebig, Bvnsen, Mendelejeff [sic], Perkin, and van't Hoff.
