= MIT class ring =

Commemorative ring for MIT graduates

Massachusetts Institute of Technology's class ring, often called the Brass Rat, is a commemorative ring for the graduating class of undergraduate students at MIT. The ring is redesigned each year by a committee of MIT students. The class ring has three main sections: the bezel, containing MIT's mascot, the beaver; the MIT seal (seal shank); and the class year (class shank). The side surfaces of the current ring design show the Boston and Cambridge skylines. A map of the MIT campus and the student's name are engraved on the inner surface. On earlier versions, the Great Dome and Building 10 facade were featured on each shank, with "MIT" under it on one side and the class year on the other. The version of the MIT class ring for graduate students is known as the "Grad Rat".

The phrase "Brass Rat" is derived from the alleged resemblance of the gold (hence brass-like appearance) beaver to a rat. Among other reasons the beaver was chosen as mascot (and therefore for the front bezel of the ring) because it is an American animal, and considered to be "the engineer of the animal world". The ring is not literally made of brass, and has typically been made in various alloys of gold, platinum, or stainless steel.

== Tradition ==
The Brass Rat is traditionally worn on the right hand with the Beaver "sitting" on the wearer until graduation. This represents the hardships imposed on students at MIT. In addition, the skyline of Boston is facing the student, representing the outside world awaiting. After graduation, the ring is turned around, and the Cambridge skyline is visible to the graduate, as a reminder of times spent at MIT.

=== Ceremonies ===
The undergraduate ring is designed and presented in the sophomore year of each class. The design is unveiled during the Ring Premiere in the start of the spring term, which is followed months later by the Ring Delivery in the same term. The latter has been a tradition since 1999 (Class of 2001), and is typically a formal occasion. Ring Delivery ceremonies have been held on a harbor cruise, at prestigious restaurants, and at the Boston Public Library.

=== Ring elements ===
Although parts of the ring change each year, typically the MIT seal is on one shank of the ring, and a depiction of the Great Dome is on the other side. The 2008 Brass Rat was the first in recent years to revert to the original style of the ring, placing the seal and Dome above the "MIT" and "08" respectively. The 2010 Brass Rat was the first to incise the "MIT" and "2010" on the shanks of the ring. The tradition of the skylines began with the Class of 1990 ring, for which the mold process in manufacturing was altered from 3 pieces to 5 pieces. The change was not followed by the Class of 1991, but resumed and has continued since the Class of 1992's ring.

== History ==
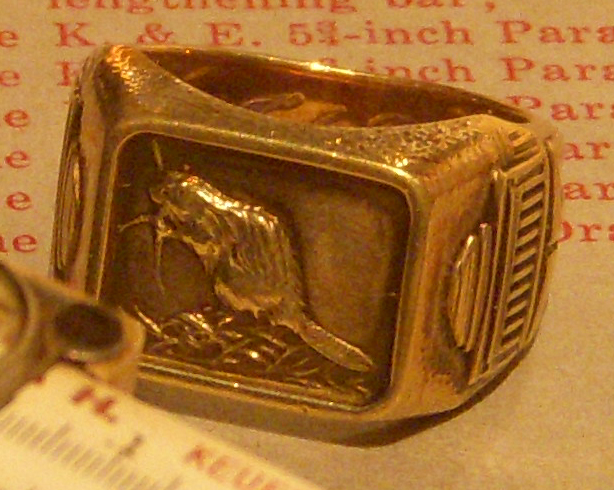
Bezel (1930)

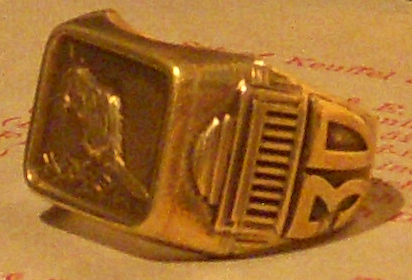
Shank (1930)

The ring was first proposed in 1929 and labeled the "Standard Technology Ring".

In the spring of 1929, C. Brigham Allen, President of the class of 1929, appointed a ring committee consisting of one member of each of the classes of 1930, 1931, and 1932. The committee was headed by Theodore A. Riehl, and its sole purpose was to provide a ring which the Institute Committee would approve as the Standard Technology Ring. In October the committee submitted its first detailed report to the Institute Committee and requested a decision as to whether the Institute Dome or the Beaver should be used on the face of the ring. This precipitated a vigorous discussion concerning the exact status of the Beaver as the Institute mascot. Investigation showed that, on January 17, 1914, President Maclaurin formally accepted the Beaver as the mascot of the Institute at the annual dinner of the Technology Club of N.Y. Lester Gardner (SB, 1898) explained the decision:

We first thought of the kangaroo which like Tech, goes forward in leaps and bounds ... Then we considered the elephant. He is wise, patient, strong, hard working and like all [students] who graduate from Tech, has a good tough hide. But neither of these were American animals. We turned to William Temple Hornaday's textbook, The American Natural History: A Foundation of Useful Knowledge of the Higher Animals of North America (1906) and instantly chose the beaver. As you will see, the beaver not only typifies the Tech [student], but his habits are peculiarly our own. Mr. Hornaday says, "Of all the animals in the world, the beaver is noted for his engineering and mechanical skill and habits of industry. His habits are nocturnal—he does his best work in the dark."

There was no record of any action having been taken by the Institute Committee so that the body went on record as approving the Beaver for the official mascot of Technology. Opinion was still divided on the question of Dome versus Beaver, but with the realization that many schools had domes somewhere similar to Technology's, the Institute Committee decided to use the Beaver on the face of the ring. The Dome lent itself particularly well to use on the shanks.

Since that time, subsequent classes have appointed a Ring Committee to design their own MIT ring. The goal of these committees has been to create a ring that keeps the design recognizable, yet introduces changes that will allow that ring to always be identified with their class. The ring has since become a traditional symbol of an MIT education.

With the spread of economical computer numerical control and then 3D printing (both are technologies which were pioneered by MIT people) throughout the jewelry industry, the cost of producing custom designs each year has dropped dramatically. As a result, ring designs have changed more radically from year to year, as designers have taken advantage of greater flexibility in producing new jewelry dies.

== Grad Rat ==
The Graduate Student ring, or "Grad Rat", is redesigned every five years when the production contract expires. The Grad Rat was essentially unchanged for 73 years until its first major redesign in 2003. Unlike the undergraduate ring, the Grad Rat design (starting with the 2003 design) is personalized according to the department in which the graduate student resides and to the degree to be received (i.e., PhD, ScD, SM, etc.). The "third" new Grad Rat design was unveiled in Fall 2013 with some controversial elements, such as the inclusion of the commercial Dropbox logo and removal of any reference to the unofficial IHTFP motto.

The Grad Rat has typically been less popular among graduate students at MIT than the Brass Rat is with undergraduates, with as few as 30% of graduate students opting to buy the ring compared with 85% of undergraduates who purchase the Brass Rat. However, in recent years the Grad Rat has been gaining in popularity among graduate students. Factors contributing to the increasing popularity of the Grad Rat include the aforementioned personalization, increased visibility and marketing, and perhaps most importantly the ability to specify these personalizations (including major, graduation year, and degree) without extra charges.

== Undergrad Brass Rat ==
The ring is offered in several sizes, in various gold purities: 10, 14, or 18 karat (42%, 58%, or 75% gold alloy), as well as white gold and Celestrium (jeweler's stainless steel). A typical ring, medium size and 14-karat gold, would cost US$616 in 2010 (Class of 2012 ring).

== Recycling Brass Rats ==
In an effort to make sure undergraduates have access to obtaining their own Brass Rat, the MIT Alumni Association and Brass Rat collector Stephen D. Fantone established the MIT Brass Rat Melt Project which accepts both rings and donations to melt down donated rings which are mixed into the ore to make next generation rings.

== Sightings ==
=== MIT hacks ===
- A giant Brass Rat was precision manufactured to fit the barrel of a cannon from Caltech's Fleming House, which had been appropriated in an MIT hack on April 6, 2006. The 21-pound (9.5 kg) ring was machined from solid aluminum under computer numerical control, and then gold-plated before being fitted around the cannon and secured with four set screws. The Brass Rat was reclaimed before the cannon's return, and is now in the collection of the MIT Museum. In 2011, the artifact was on display as part of the MIT 150 year-long exhibition commemorating the 150th anniversary of MIT's founding charter.
- A cast bronze Brass Rat was temporarily attached to a finger of the John Harvard statue in Harvard Yard in May 1979. The statue itself had been sculpted in 1884 by Daniel Chester French, an MIT alumnus.

=== Film appearances ===
- Stir Crazy: Inmate Grossberger was played by Erland Van Lidth De Jeude, a 1976 MIT graduate in Course VI (Electrical Engineering and Computer Science), while wearing his Brass Rat.
- Sneakers: Cosmo (played by Jo Marr) is hacking into computer networks in the opening scene wearing a Brass Rat. The police rush past the columns of 77 Massachusetts Avenue to arrest him.
- Iron Man: Lieutenant Colonel James "Rhodey" Rhodes (played by Terrence Howard) and Tony Stark (played by Robert Downey, Jr.) both wear the Brass Rat, visible on their fingers.
- Ghostbusters (2016): Scientist/Ghostbuster Erin Gilbert can be seen wearing a rather large Brass Rat in several scenes, and later wears an MIT sweatshirt.

=== Returned or recovered rings ===
- In 2011, a Grad Rat was returned to MIT. It was amongst the personal effects returned to the family when PFC Stephen Adams was killed in action in 1968, but no one in the family could identify a connection between Adams and MIT. The ring remains in the possession of the Institute until the owner can be identified.
- Several alumni have had lost rings returned through the MIT Alumni Association.
- When Brass Rats have appeared in on-line auctions, alumni have been known to bid prices beyond the value of the gold contained in the ring.
