= Yaqeen Hammad =

Palestinian influencer (2013–2025)

- Born: 2013
- Died: 23 May 2025 (aged 11); Deir al-Balah
- Cause of death: Israeli airstrike
- Known for: Social media influencer

Yaqeen Hammad (2013 – 23 May 2025) was a Palestinian social media influencer who was known for sharing humanitarian updates during the Gaza war. She was killed at the age of 11 in an Israeli airstrike on her family's house in Deir al-Balah.

== Biography ==
Hammad was born in 2013. She was the youngest of five siblings, and grew up in Deir al-Balah. Her uncle is Hussein Hassan, a Red Crescent paramedic, and her older brother Mohamed is a humanitarian worker.

During the Gaza war, Yaqeen and Mohamed provided displaced families with food, toys and clothing. Yaqeen was the Gaza Strip's youngest social media influencer, and shared videos on Instagram showcasing her work with Ouena, a non-profit organization dedicated to humanitarian aid in the Gaza Strip. She also posted tips on how to survive Israel's ongoing bombing of the Gaza Strip.

In one of her final videos posted on 15 May, Yaqeen said, "In spite of the war, in spite of the genocide, we came here to bring joy to the children."

== Death ==
On 23 May 2025, Hammad was killed in an Israeli airstrike on her family's house in the Al-Baraka area of Deir al-Balah. She was 11 years old. Her body was recovered from under the rubble.

Following the news of Hammad's death, tributes to her flooded social media. Al Jazeera correspondent Wael Al-Dahdouh shared the news of her death and stated that "no one is immune". Hani Abu Rizq, a journalist and colleague of Hammad, said, "She had an entrepreneurial spirit and was always the first to do good. She loved helping others and bringing joy to children in displacement camps. She had a special touch, spreading hope and optimism among people despite the difficult circumstances." Palestinian photojournalist Amr Tabash wrote, "Yaqeen was martyred, yet certainty remains in our hearts that the children of Gaza are the heartbeat of humanity and a reflection of global silence."

== See also ==
- Effect of the Gaza war on children in the Gaza Strip
