= Elevator surfing =

Activity involving riding on top of elevators

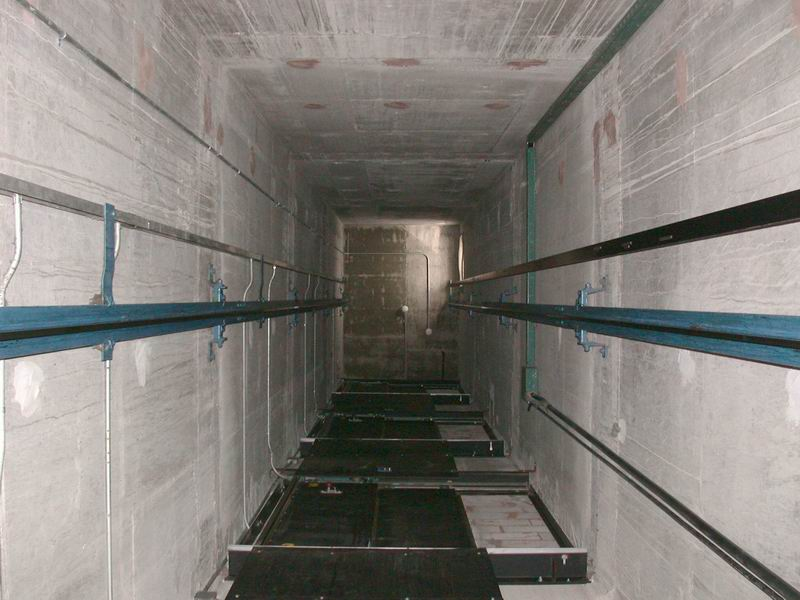
Interior of a hydraulic elevator shaft from an elevator surfer's point of view

Elevator surfing, also known as lift surfing, is the usually clandestine activity of riding on top of elevators rather than inside them. It is typically considered a form of urban exploration, aligned more with investigative experiences like rooftopping and tunnel hacking than with adventurous urban sports like train surfing. Experienced surfers may attempt riskier maneuvers such as jumping between moving elevators, or riding the elevator's counterweight.

While elevator surfing was most prominent as a subculture in the United States and United Kingdom in the 1990s, it made a comeback in the late 2010s, with partakers often posting footage of their adventures on YouTube and similar platforms.

Access into the elevator shaft (the hoistway) is often achieved using an elevator key—like those carried by first responders and building maintenance staff—to open the outer doors. Alternatively, participants may utilize lock picking techniques or use tools like coat hangers and metallic bars to force the elevator car's door interlock open between floors and unlatch the outer doors from the inside. Elevator surfers usually cannot use the emergency hatch in the roof of the elevator to access the shaft, as these are designed for first responder use and cannot be opened from the inside.

Elevator surfing typically occurs in skyscrapers or on college campuses, especially those with tall buildings. Participation is often illegal, and if caught, surfers may face other charges like trespassing.

== Origins ==
Although the first instances of elevator surfing are unknown, by 1990, the activity was noted for its popularity among children in New York City public housing projects. Children as young as six partook in the activity, often as game of chicken. During the same time period, elevator surfing became popular on college campuses, especially along the East Coast of the United States.

== Hazards ==
Elevator surfers can be electrocuted, crushed between the elevator and the sides of the elevator shaft, be struck by the counterweight, or slip and fall to their deaths.

== Injuries and deaths ==
In November 1989, twelve-year-old Walter McMillan of Harlem, New York City, was found dead on top of an elevator car in the Polo Grounds housing project where he had been playing; his legs had been crushed between the car and a beam, resulting in his death. Walter had been a member of the "Little Tough Guys", a group of roughly thirty-five children known for elevator surfing, and police had tried to warn him of the dangers of the activity.

Also in November 1989, thirteen-year-old Paul Curley was found dead after he became entangled in the machinery while surfing the lifts at Divis Tower, Belfast.

In March 1990, Joel Mangion, a University of Massachusetts Amherst student, was found dead in the bottom of an elevator shaft at his dormitory. Friends reported that he had been jumping from one car to another in the double shaft. While attempting the jump, he slipped and became wedged between the cab and the wall, falling sixteen stories to his death.

In March 1991, Michael Deliduka, a twenty-three-year-old Indiana State University aviation student, and his peers used a coat hanger to wedge open elevator doors after a night'of drinking. They gained access to the tops of the elevators and subsequently attempted to move between them. While Deliduka was attempting to repair a stuck elevator, it activated, pinning him between the carriage and another elevator part and killing him instantly.

Also in March 1991, twelve-year-old Edwin Ortiz, of New York City's Lower East Side, slipped and fell to his death from the top of an elevator at the Lillian Wald Houses.

In September 1992, Michael Schlosser, a Southern Methodist University student and athlete, slipped while hanging onto the bottom of an elevator, falling thirty feet through the shaft and succumbing to blunt force head injuries. His companion also fell the same distance but sustained only a broken arm. The event prompted SMU to install safety locks on elevator doors so that they could not be pried open with hangers or other tools and would instead open only when an elevator is present.

In May 1997, ten-year-old Paul Illingworth was discovered dead at the bottom of an elevator shaft in his Leeds housing estate. He had been riding on the top of the elevator and fell eight floors to his death.

In April 1999, fourteen-year-old Jason Nolan of Dublin died after becoming trapped between the elevator walls and mechanism at the top of the shaft in the elevator at his apartment complex. Another resident who had been in the elevator at the time of the accident reported a sudden shaking, followed by a halt, and heard Nolan's friends screaming and a breathing sound that subsequently stopped.

In December 2006, eighteen-year-old Jonathan Figueroa was found dead at the bottom of an elevator shaft in a Bedford-Stuyvesant apartment complex. His body had likely been in the shaft for two to three days.

== See also ==
- Car surfing
- List of train-surfing injuries and deaths
- Skitching
- Train surfing
