= List of train-surfing injuries and deaths =

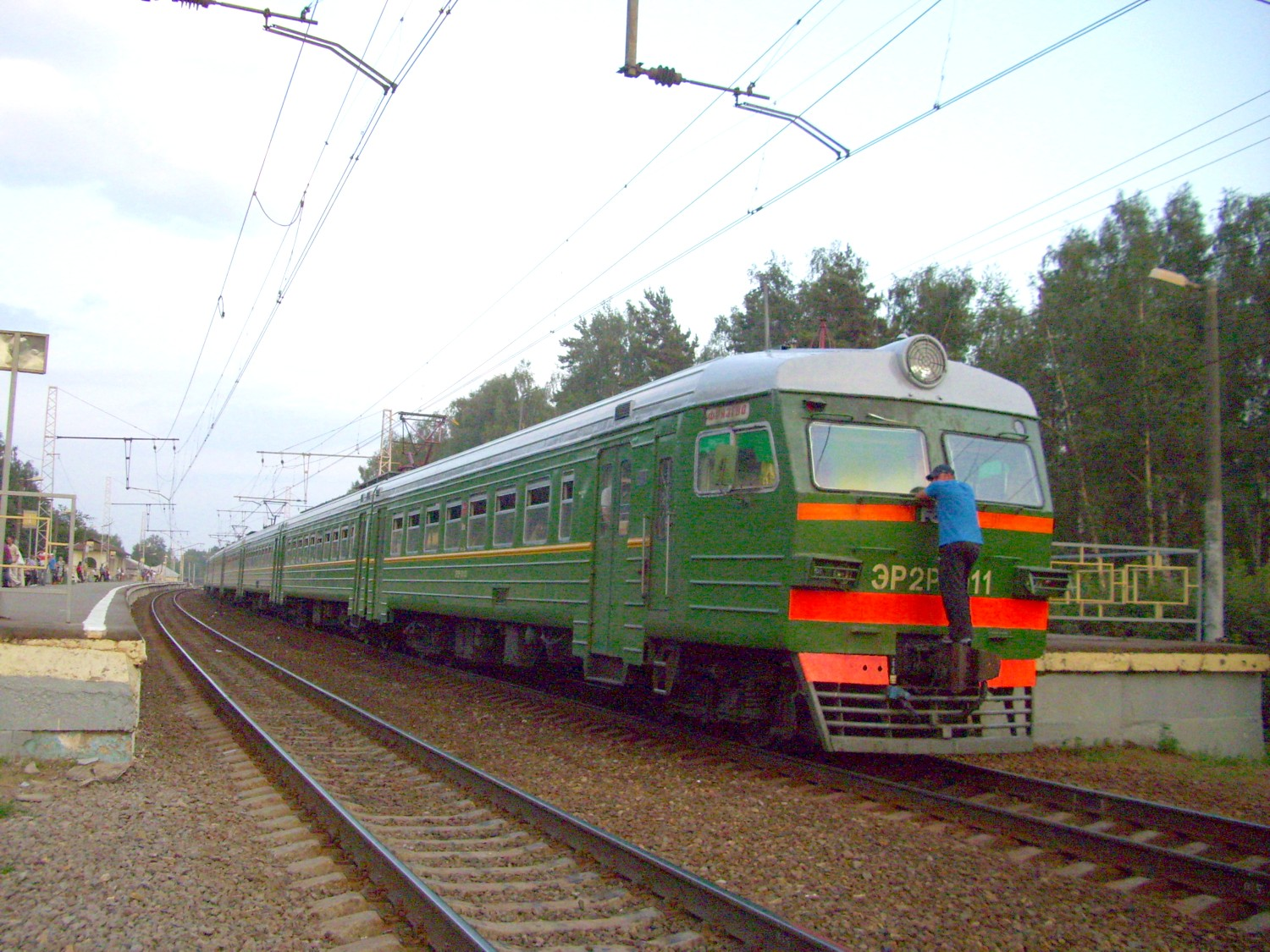
Kupavna, Russia in 2010

This is a list of train-surfing injuries and deaths.

== Overview ==
Common ways that accidents occur during train-surfing include people falling from the roof of the train, falling from the side of the train, falling underneath the wheels of a train, and colliding with an object located on the outside of the train such as a bridge, a signal bridge, a sign, a pole or another oncoming train.

Other ways accidents occur include when a person comes into contact with the overhead power lines on the roof of a train and receives an electric shock and when a person receives an electric shock without touching the overhead power line after receiving an electric arc that has moved over to their body through the air. Accidents also occur when people come into contact with the trains pantograph.

Accidents have also occurred when people have attempted to create graffiti on the outside of trains and then collided with a passing object as well as people falling from a train after attempting to take a photo or selfie.

In relation to 41 train surfing accidents that occurred in Berlin between 1989–1995 it has been commented that "Collision with close-to-track obstacles and slipping from the train proved to be the major sources of danger.". Three medical studies have been underaken that looked into the electrical burns injuries that people have received after they were train surfing on the roof of a train and they received an electric shock.

=== Electric arcs ===
Overhead power lines on railways are able to create electric arcs and it has been commented that "Importantly, electrocution may occur even in the absence of direct contact, as high voltage arcs can discharge through the air and cause devastating injuries." In 2013 Julius Gerhardt was spraying graffiti on freight carriages when he climbed on top of a carriage to tag a bridge. He was holding a spray can in his right hand, and an electric arc jumped over to the spray can and went through his hand, arm, and chest, then exited out of his right foot. He lost consciousness and was then lifted up and carried to a street by the people who were with him. He was in a coma in hospital for 36 hours, and then later put into a medically induced coma for a week. He received burns to over 90% of his body. Gerhardt commented that "I didn't know about arcs. In the arc, like lightning, electricity is conducted through the air. I had the spray can in my right hand. When I raised my hand, the metal became an antenna. The air transmitted the voltage—and I flew off the train car." It has further been commented that "...it is quite possible that from a distance of one meter, a breakdown [electric arc] will occur on a wristwatch, a phone in a pocket or a belt buckle, that is, on any metal object."

For an electric arc to occur there does not need to be a metallic object on a persons body as the high amount of water in human bodies is enough to create an electric arc and it has been commented that "...on the roof of an electric train, there is a risk of injury due to electric shock at a distance of up to 1.5 meters from the high-voltage contact wire. That is, to receive a strong electric shock, it is not necessary to touch the wire - it is enough to be in close proximity. The nominal voltage of the contact wire is 3000 volts. Under operating conditions, it varies from 2000 to 4000 volts. The distance at which the electric current strikes varies depending on the voltage in the contact network and climatic conditions - for example, humidity or air temperature."

In 2013 a 15 year-old was train surfing in Scotland when an electric arc jumped over to his body from overhead power lines. He was taken to hospital and was in a critical but stable condition, and it was thought that he had not "...touched the cables but was struck by an arc of electricity after getting too close to the wires." In 2012, a 17-year-old in Ebersberg climbed onto the roof of a train; after the train moved a few metres, he was hit by an electric arc, and the train stopped moving due to a short circuit. He fell off the side of the train and received burns to 75% of his body. He was put into an artificial coma and was in a very critical condition. At the time of the accident it was commented that "The current radiates from a cable like that up to 1.5 meters away. This is called an arc. So you don't even have to touch the line directly to get an electric shock...".

== Data of train-surfing injuries and deaths ==
Location	Time period	Overall total accidents	Died	Injured
Australia – Melbourne	1990–1992		3	
Austria	Jan 1994 – Dec 2008		1	12
Austria	1994 – 2024			32
Brazil – Rio de Janeiro	1990	160		
Brazil – São Paulo	1990	34		
Brazil – Rio de Janeiro	August 1991 – August 2000	200	100	
Germany – Berlin	1989–1995	41	18	
Russia – Moscow and Moscow Oblast	2012			17
Russia – Moscow and Moscow Oblast	January – June 2014		3	16
Russia – Moscow and Moscow Oblast	2014			48
Russia – Moscow and Moscow Oblast	2015		13	12
Russia – Moscow	1 January – 20 August 2018		5	
Russia – Nizhny Novgorod	2017			12
Russia – Moscow region, St Petersburg, Krasnoyarsk region	January - May 2025		8	
Russia – Central Federal District	2012		4	15
Russia – Central Federal District	2013			16
Russia – Central Federal District	2015		16	24
Russia – Central Federal District	April–June 2016		4	
Russia – Central Federal District	2016		9	
Russia – Central Federal District	2017		14	
Russia – Central Federal District	2024		25	20
Russia – Central Federal District	2025	28	11	
South Africa	2006	100	19	
Ukraine	2013			10
Ukraine	1 January – 29 July 2014			7
Ukraine	2016		16	
Ukraine	2017		12	
United Kingdom	In the years prior to August 1995		7	
United Kingdom	April 2005 – March 2015		6	
United States – New York	1989–2011		13	56

== Train-surfing injuries and deaths ==
Date	Location	Died/ Injured	Type	Ages	Description
1974	United Kingdom	Died	Collided with train	14	A 14-year-old boy was on the running board of a train when he fell from it and was then decapitated by a train.
10 August 1981	United States – New York	Died	Collided with train/Electric shock	20 and 21	A 21 year-old man was riding in the space in between train carriages on a moving 4 train when it is thought he may have attempted to have jumped onto the platform and then fell underneath the moving train carriages and was killed. His 20 year-old brother who was also on the train jumped down to the railway track in an attempt to help him. Whilst on the railway track he received an electric shock and was killed.
22 November 1984	United States – Newark / Harrison	Died	Electric shock / Collided with train	Both 21	Two men died when they climbed on top of the roof of a train, came into contact with the train's pantograph and were electrocuted. One was found lying on the roof of the train as it arrived at a train station, while the second man fell from the train and onto a second set of railway tracks where an oncoming train hit him.
December 1986	Australia	Died	Collision with signal box	14	A teen boy was leaning out of a moving train while attempting to spray paint graffiti on the side of the train, when his head collided with a signal box. He later died from his injuries.
6 June 1988	Australia – Melbourne	Injured	Collided with sign	17	A 17-year-old was standing on a small ledge on the outside of a moving train when they hit their head on a railway sign and fell under the wheels of the train. They were found lying 100 metres from the sign by another train driver and it is thought that they remained conscious the whole time. Both their legs were amputated above the knee, and it remained uncertain as to whether more of their right leg would need to be amputated.
1988	United Kingdom – London	Died	Fell under train	18	A person died when they were riding on the outside of a train and they fell under it.
Late 1988	Australia	Died	Collision with signal box	15	A teen boy died when while they were hanging out of a moving train attempting to paint the outside of it.
22 June 1989	United States – Ulster	Died	Collided with bridge	24	A 24-year-old woman and a 30-year-old man jumped onto the roof of a Conrail train that was stopped beneath the U.S. Route 209 overpass and then as the train began to move they began riding on its roof. As they were riding on the roof of the train they then both collided with the U.S. Route 209 overpass and fell from the train and the 24-year-old woman died.
11 August 1989	Australia	Died	Collision with signal box	16	A teen boy died when he was leaning from a train carriage door attempting to create graffiti on the outside of the train and his head collided with a signal box. A marker pen was found on the railway tracks nearby, there was fresh graffiti on the train, and the person had previously graffitied the inside of the train carriage.
October 1989	United Kingdom – London	Died	Collided with bridge	16	A person died when they were riding on the roof of a train and they collided with a bridge.
November 1989	United Kingdom – London	Died	Fell under train	9	A person died when they were riding on the outside of a train holding on to a handrail and they fell under the train.
16 December 1989	Australia	Injured	Collision with train	15	A person was leaning out the side of a moving train and they were attempting to create graffiti on the side of the train using a felt pen when they fell underneath the wheels of the train about 400 metres (1,300 ft) from a train station. Their left leg was amputated and they received microsurgery on their right leg and it was uncertain as to whether the person would need to have their right leg amputated.
	Germany – Berlin	Injured	Collided with pillar	15	A person was sitting down on the edge of a train with their legs hanging out the side and a pillar hit their leg and they received multiple fractures of their left leg with complications.
	Germany – Berlin	Died	Collided with pillar	?	A person died when they were riding on the outside of a train and their head collided with a pillar.
27 January 1992	Australia – Sydney	Died	Electric shock	15	As a train pulled out from a station a person climbed onto the roof from the space in between train carriages and they received an electric shock and died.
4 July 1992	Australia – Sydney	Died	Electric shock	23	As a train was arriving at a station a person climbed onto its roof and received an electric shock and was killed.
27 May 1994	United Kingdom – London	Died	Collided with train/ Fall	14 approx.	It was thought that a person was train surfing and holding onto the edge of a train when they fell under a train and was killed.
31 May 1994	United States – New York	Died	Collided with object	19	A 19-year-old was riding on top of a train when it is thought they hit the entrance to a tunnel and were killed.
	United Kingdom	Died	Fall	21	A person was riding on the outside of a train and holding on to it as it was travelling at 70 mph when they fell from the train and died.
May 1995	United Kingdom	Injured	Fall	22	A person was riding on the outside of a train when they fell between the train and a station platform and was dragged along the train track and they had their right leg amputated and was seriously ill in hospital.
4 January 1996	Australia – Melbourne	Died	Collided with bridge and train	17	A person died when they were riding on the outside of a train and they collided with a bridge and then fell from the train and into the path of another train.
26 January 1996	Australia – Melbourne	Injured	Collided with overpass	17	A person was injured when they were riding on the outside of a train and they hit their head on an overpass and received a suspected fractured vertebra and lacerations to their left eye and skull.
15 July 1996	United States – New York	Died	Collided with object	14	A 14-year-old boy died when they climbed on top of a moving 2 train near the Bronx Park East station, hit his head on a signal light and was thrown to the tracks.
18 December 1996	United Kingdom	Injured	Fall	15	As a train was moving away from the station, someone jumped onto a rear carriage; as they tried to get off, they lost their footing and fell from the train. They received serious head and leg injuries and were in a stable condition in hospital.
13 February 1997	Australia – Melbourne	Died	Electric shock	16	As a train was arriving at a train station a person was found lying dead on the roof of the train. The victim may have received an electric shock while train surfing on the roof of the train.
January 2000	Australia – Melbourne	Injured	?	?	A person was seriously injured while train surfing.
30 January 2000	United States – New York	Died	Collided with train/Fall	Both 15	Both teenage boys were surfing on an N train in Brooklyn at the Bay Parkway station when they fell off the roof of the train and were both struck by an oncoming train.
6 March 2000	United States – New York	Injured	Collision with train	Both 20s	Two men were surfing on an E train in Queens as the train entered the Jackson Heights–Roosevelt Avenue/74th Street station, one fell underneath the wheels of the train while the other was struck by an oncoming train. Both men were taken to a hospital in critical condition.
10 June 2000	Australia – Melbourne	Injured	?	19	A person was found lying unconscious on the roof of a train at a train station and they were not breathing and they were taken to hospital with serious head injuries and remained in a critical condition. They were found on a train that had been travelling between train stations.
19 May 2001	United Kingdom – London	Died	Fall	16	Surfing on a "tram" when he was grabbing on to the outside of the vehicle, and while the tram was moving off, he fell onto the rails, and then suffered head injuries.
17 July 2001	Australia – Melbourne	Injured	Electric shock	20	A train arrived at a train station and a person climbed onto the roof of the train and it was speculated that they attempted to ride on the roof of the train and they received an electric shock and fell head first onto the station platform. They received head and burns injuries and did not have a pulse and they were then resuscitated and taken to hospital were they remained in a critical but stable condition.
16 October 2001	United Kingdom	Injured	Electric shock	14	A person was train surfing, while he was playing several games with some other people, he slipped, fell, and received an electric shock with a total of 25,000 volts of electricity.
2 January 2002	United States – New York	Died	Collided with train	20	Surfing on a C train in Brooklyn when he was knocked off the back or on top of the train and was struck by an oncoming A train at the Clinton–Washington Avenues station.
16 January 2002	United States – New York	Died	Collided with train	Adult	A man was most likely subway surfing on an A train in Manhattan when he jumped into a path of a subway train at the 42nd Street–Port Authority Bus Terminal station and 8th Avenue.
14 October 2002	United States – New York	Died	Collided with object	22	It was commented that "...Alex Nasad, a graffiti artist who went by Drone... ...was killed in 2002 while he was train surfing an uptown 1 train and apparently hit a support beam."
21 October 2002	United States – New York	Died	Collided with object	18	An 18-year-old Bronx man was subway surfing on top of a 6 train in the Bronx when he was struck (or hit) by a stationary object near the Elder Avenue station.
5 November 2002	United Kingdom – East Sussex	Died	Collided with object	18	An 18-year-old was returning home by train from East Sussex, and they climbed out of the window and onto the roof. It is thought that he was killed when the train traveled over a bridge and he hit the bridge. Another passenger alerted the train driver using the emergency cord, and the train stopped at the next station.
29 November 2002	United States – New York	Died	Collided with train	20s	A man was struck by a northbound Q train when he was lying down on the tracks and unable to move. Most likely subway surfing on a B train in Brooklyn.
2 December 2002	United Kingdom – London	Died	Collided with tunnel	20s	A person was riding on the outside of a train after waving at friends on the train. He struck a tunnel wall at the Chalk Farm tube station, killing him.
20 October 2003	United States – New York	Died	Collided with object	14	A person was riding between two carriages using a safety chain and they climbed up the space in between the carriages to the top and wedged their legs in between two carriages. They were hit by a trackside beam, thrown onto the tracks by the impact and then hit by the rear carriages of the train.
14 November 2003	United States – New York	Died/Injured	Fall	21 and 22	Two men were surfing on a 6 train in the Bronx, but they were knocked off the back cars and fell off the back of the train at the Morrison Avenue–Soundview station. A 22 year-old was killed and a 21 year-old was in critical condition.
4 December 2003	Australia – Melbourne	Injured	Electric shock	15	A person was riding on the roof of a train when they touched the train's power supply, lost consciousness, and received burns to their stomach, chest and arms.
2004	South Africa	Injured	Electric shock	15	A person was riding on a train carriage when they received an electric shock from the overhead power lines. They lost the use of their right hand, lost their two front teeth and broke two ribs.
14 February 2004	Netherlands – Maassluis	Died	?	15	Two people boarded a train at a station and opened a window. As the train started moving they then began to hang on the outside of the train from the window. As the train was leaving the station platform it was speculated that one of the people had been unable to let go of the window in time and became stuck between the train and the platform and were dragged along, and were found lying 200 metres from the station platform. The person died in the accident.
24 September 2004	United Kingdom – Northwich	Injured	Collided with Train	14	A person climbed onto the outside of a freight train and they rode on it a short distance. The train began to pick up speed after it had left a train station and as the person attempted to get off the train they lost their grip and was dragged underneath the wheels of the train. One leg was amputated below the groin and the second leg was amputated below the knee and they were in a critical condition in hospital and then their condition later improved.
14 November 2004	England – North Shields	Died	Fall	19	A person who was a prankster was riding on the roof of a metro train when he suddenly lost his whole balance at a station on North Tyneside.
11 October 2005	United States – New York	Injured	Fall	23	A person was riding on the roof of a train when they fell from it and landed on a railway track receiving skull and pelvic injuries and they were in a critical condition.
30 January 2006	Australia – Melbourne	Died	Electric shock	20s	A man was electrocuted when he was train surfing on top of a city bound train near the Heathmont railway station.
2 March 2006	South Africa – Johannesburg	Died	Electric shock	35 approx.	A person was riding on the roof of a train when they were electrocuted at the Longdale station.
12 May 2006	South Africa – Soweto	Died	Electric shock	18	The person had been standing on the roof of the train at the Ikwezi station when he was electrocuted.
9 July 2006	United States – Massachusetts	Injured	Electric shock	34	A person was climbing on top of an Acela train in Massachusetts when he electrocuted himself on the parked train while trying to practice surfing on top of it. He received 25,000 volts of electricity.
3 September 2006	United States – Texas	Died	Fall	18 (unconfirmed)	A person jumped onto the roof of a moving train along Wellborn Road when they suddenly tripped, slipped, and fell off. Pronounced dead at the scene.
3 November 2006	South Africa – Soweto	Died	Fall	15	A person was train surfing on top of a train in Soweto with 2 friends when he tumbled off and fell between Moletsane and Mapetla after toying around with death.
11 November 2006	South Africa	Died	Electric shock/Fall	15 approx.	Was train surfing when he was jumping and running with some fellows but then was electrocuted and then fell to his death.
26 April 2007	South Africa	Injured	Fall	16 approx.	A person was riding on the roof of a train when they received an electric shock and fell from the train and received a head injury and their condition was stabilised and they were taken to hospital.
11 April 2007	South Africa	Injured	Fall	16	A person riding on the roof of a train received an electric shock and fell from the train and received severe burns and possible fractures.
12 May 2007	Denmark – Midtjylland – Ringkøbing	Died	Collided with object	22	A 22-year-old died when they were riding on the top of a train when it travelled through a viaduct and they collided the edge of the viaduct.
15 October 2007	United States – New York	Died	Fall	21	A person died when they were riding on the roof of a train and they fell off.
2008	Ukraine – Kyiv	Died	Fall	15	The body of a 15-year-old was found on the railway tracks after they had fallen from a train while riding on the outside of it.
14 February 2008	South Africa – Soweto	Died	Electric shock	16	A person was electrocuted on Valentine's Day when he was train surfing at the Inhlanzane station. His body was then buried down a week later.
18 May 2008	Australia – Melbourne	Died	Unconfirmed	20	A person climbed onto the roof of a train around 1:00 am and then at 8:30 am their body was found several stations away still on top of the roof of the train. It was thought that the person had received an electric shock.
5 February 2009	New Zealand – Christchurch	Died	Collision with bridge	23, 25	Two people died when they were riding on the roof of a freight train and they collided with a pedestrian bridge.
13 March 2009	England – Walton-on-Thames	Injured	Suspected to fall	20	A person was riding on top of a London bound train when he fell off the roof and sustained head injuries.
19 March 2010	South Africa – Durban	Died	Electric shock	Adult	A person was electrocuted in KwaZulu-Natal when he was riding on the roof of a train.
21 April 2010	South Africa – Kempton Park	Died	Suspected to fall	15	A person has died when they were riding outside of a moving train in Kempton Park. They were flung out of the roof, suffered injuries, and then died.
6 May 2010	Australia – Sydney	Died	Suspected to fall	18	A person who is a former National Basketball League (NBL) player was train surfing in Sydney and seemed to have lost his foot at first while trying to get off of the train but then lost his whole balance and then died.
16 May 2010	Germany – Baden-Württemberg	Injured	Electric Shock	18	A person was injured when they were riding on the roof of a train and there was a flash of light and a loud bang and they received an electric shock. The injuries they received suggest they may have been crawling on all fours on the roof of the train when they received the electric shock.
23 May 2010	Netherlands – Rotterdam	Injured	Fall	23	A train was about to leave a train station and a person held onto an open window of the train and began riding on the outside of the train and after 40 to 50 metres the person fell between the train and the platform. They were taken to hospital and received injuries including a broken arm, a collapsed lung and bleeding in their spleen.
31 October 2010	Australia – Mandurah	Died	Suspected fall	29	A person was train surfing which was a prank until he might have fallen off of the roof of the train and died at the scene at the Bull Creek railway station.
6 December 2010	United Kingdom – London	Injured	Fall	17	A person was riding on top of a moving c2c train when he fell and tumbled off when the train pulled into the Benfleet railway station.
14 February 2011	Russia – Moscow	Died	Collided with tunnels	19, 19	Two people died when they were riding on the roof of a train and it is thought that they collided with objects attached to a train tunnel. It was commented that "At first they rode on the Fili-Bagrationovskaya section, but were caught by the police. They should have gone home, but they went to Kuntsevskaya, where they started riding trains towards the center. Everyone tried to talk them out of it — the thing is that this section hasn’t been tested. Most likely, they didn’t fit into some gauge." It was further commented that "...the new Rusich cars, which are equipped on the Filevskaya line of the metro, are slightly larger in size than the previous models... The new car fits into the tunnel almost flush. A person cannot even fit on the roof of the Rusich..." and it is thought that "...the boys received injuries from collisions with tunnel structures or the size limiters of the electric train." One of the two people was found lying on top of the accordion style gangway connection between the carriages and the second person was found lying on the ground in a train tunnel. They both received craniocerebral injuries and basal skull fractures.
26 February 2011	Australia – Sydney	Died	Electric shock/Collided with object	22	A person was badly injured at first when he clambered onto the top of a moving Sydney train at the Windsor station, but he then died in a hospital.
	Indonesia – Jakarta	Died	Fall	21	It is thought a person may have died as a result of riding on the roof of a train and then falling from it. It is also thought that it is possible they were texting at the time that they fell.
19 August 2011	England – Durham	Died	Electric shock/Fall	23	After due to the fact that his shoe flew onto the top of a train, he tries to retrieve his shoe by climbing on top of a train, but he was electrocuted and the fell off the train and into his death.
26 August 2011	South Africa – Durban	Injured	Electric shock	13	An Umlazi person was surfing on a Metrorail (South Africa) train with other teens when he received some electrical shocks to his body and lost one of his arms.
5 September 2011	United States – Longmont	Injured	Underneath train wheels	17	A person was alongside a moving freight train when they attempted to climb aboard the train while it was moving. The person described what occurred:"I managed to grab on with my arms ... but my legs didn't make it up onto the train. Instead, they bounced underneath it and dragged against the tracks until they weren't legs anymore.... I was conscious the whole time. I got to see my detached limbs lying next to me on the pavement.". She lost her left leg from above the knee and her right leg from below the knee.
December 2011	Russia – Moscow Oblast	Died	Fall	?	A person died when they were riding on the outside of the Sapsan train and they fell from it and were killed.
24 January 2012	Australia – Melbourne	Died	Electric shock	17	A 17-year-old was with five friends at a train a station intending to travel back to their home. At about 11:00 pm, he was on the roof of the train when he came into contact with wires at Caulfield. Ambulance officers who arrived at the station had to wait for electricity to be turned off before being able to provide assistance to the person on the train roof. The 17-year-old died whilst they were still at Caulfield station.
7 February 2012	Russia – St Petersburg	Died	Collision with train	24	As a train began to depart a train station a person jumped from the platform onto the connection in between the carriages and they fell from the train and landed underneath the wheels of the train and died.
23 March 2012	India – Mumbai	Died	Electric shock	64 (unconfirmed age)	A person was attempting to imitate a train surfing stunt. While doing so, he received electric shocks, fell off from the roof of the train, and was killed while doing so near Dadar in Mumbai.
31 March 2012	Russia – Moscow	Injured	Electric Shock	14	A person was thought to have been riding on the roof of a train when they received an electric shock and received serious burns.
4 May 2012	Russia – Moscow	Died	Fall	17	A person died when they were riding on an inter-car coupling in between the carriages and they fell onto the railway line.
7 May 2012	Russia – Moscow	Injured	Collision with object or tunnel	18	A person was riding on the roof of a train when they hit their head on either the archway of a tunnel or an object on the tunnels roof. They received head injuries and damaged internal organs and they were in a critical condition in hospital.
19 May 2012	Australia – Melbourne	Injured	Fall	Teenager	A person was riding on the roof of the rear carriage of a train when they fell, collided with the side of the train and then landed on the tack bed. The person received severe head injuries and injuries to their upper body. Whilst unconscious they were transported to a hospital, underwent surgery and remained in a critical condition.
19 May 2012	Germany – Bavaria	Injured	Electric shock from an arc	17	A person climbed onto the roof of a train and after the train moved a few metres they were hit by an electric arc and the train stopped moving due to a short circuit. The person fell off the side of the train and they received burns to 75% of their body, were put into an artificial coma and were in a very critical condition. At the time of the accident it was commented that "The current radiates from a cable like that up to 1.5 meters away. This is called an arc. So you don't even have to touch the line directly to get an electric shock,".
10 June 2012	Russia – Khabarovsk Territory	Died	Fall underneath train	10	Two 10-year-olds were travelling on a freight train in between carriages. As they were riding it they both jumped from the freight carriage and the clothes of one of the 10-year-olds got caught on the outside train and they fell underneath the wheels of the train and died.
June 2012	Russia – Ulan-Ude	Died	Electric shock	estimated around 30	A person who was thought to be a train surfer jumped from a pedestrian bridge onto a freight train that was passing by below them. They caught their foot on the overhead power line and they received an electric shock and died.
16 July 2012	Russia – Moscow	Injured	Fall	21	A person was riding on the inter-car coupling on the rear car of a train and they fell from the train and received numerous fractures and were hospitalised in a serious condition.
14 September 2012	Russia – Bashkortostan	Injured	Collided with train	8	A person attempted to board a slow moving freight train, fell underneath the wheels of the train and received injuries resulting in having both their legs amputated and receiving treatment in an intensive care unit.
16 September 2012	Russia – St Petersburg	Died	Collision with train	16	A person was riding on the roof of a train, began climbing down the space between the carriages, fell underneath the wheels of the train and later died in hospital.
25 September 2012	Russia – Moscow	Injured	Fall	17	A person riding on a train fell onto the railway tracks and received a concussion, closed pelvic fracture, bruised kidney and a blunt abdominal wound.
24 March 2013	Germany – Berlin	Injured	Fall	22	A person was hanging onto the windows on the outside of a train when the train was going through the process of preparing to leave the station and the train supervisor stopped the process from continuing. The person refrained from hanging onto the window, began to move away and the train began to leave the station. The person then moved back towards the train, jumped in the direction of the window, and then slipped and fell under the train. The station supervisor began an emergency stop and he was recovered from the track bed, hospitalised after receiving serious injuries and then later his condition was stabilised.
11 April 2013	Russia – Moscow	Died	Collision with tunnel	Born 1993	A person's body was found on the gangway connection between train carriages at an underground train station. They had climbed onto the train using the gangway connection and then was injured against the side of the metro tunnel. They had received injuries including an open craniocerebral injury and a fracture of the spine.
23 May 2013	France – Paris	Died	Collided with object	20s	A person in their 20s was with a friend when they boarded a train at Denfert-Rochereau at 10 pm. One of them climbed up between two carriages and the train went into a tunnel. His head hit the edge of the tunnel and he died from his injuries.
25 May 2013	Scotland – Glasgow	Injured	Electric shock from an arc	15	A 15 year-old was train surfing when an electric arc jumped over to their body from over head power lines. He was taken to hospital and was in a critical but stable condition. It was thought that he had not "...touched the cables but was struck by an arc of electricity after getting too close to the wires."
5 June 2013	Russia – Moscow Oblast	Died, Injured	Electric shock	15–18, 25	Two people were on the roof of a train when they received an electric shock. A person aged 15–18 years old was killed and a second person, 25 years old, was taken to hospital in a serious condition.
June 2013	Russia – Moscow	Injured	Fall	15	A person was standing between the cars of a train when they fell off and received a serious head injury and remained in hospital in a serious condition.
23 June 2013	Scotland – Glasgow	Injured	Electric shock	12	A person was train surfing when he was struck by electricity on a line near the Barnhill railway station on the Springburn line in Glasgow.
22 July 2013	Ukraine – Kyiv	Died	Fall	Teenager	A person was riding on the gangway connection of a train when they fell onto the railway track, were taken to hospital and died from a head injury.
9 August 2013	Russia – Moscow	Died	Electric Shock	Born in 1995	A person was found lying dead on the roof of a train and it was thought that they had died from electric shock and it was speculated that they had been riding on the outside of the train.
30 October 2013	United States – New York	Died	Collided with object	45	A person died when they were riding on top of a train carriage and as it arrived at a train station their head collided with a metal beam and they fell down into the space in between train carriages.
5 November 2013	United States – New York	Injured	Collided with object	17	A 17-year-old was riding on top of a train with 3 friends when his head collided with a metal beam. His injuries included the loss of one eye and he was taken to hospital where he was in a serious condition.
27 November 2013	South Africa – Durban	Died	Electric shock	16	A person was with 20 friends when they were riding on top of a passenger train in Durban. The person then made contact with the train's power cables during the stunt and was killed instantly.
5 March 2014	Germany – Berlin	Died	Collided with tunnel	19	A 19-year-old was at Yorckstrasse station and climbed onto the roof of a train with four friends. Between Julius-Leber-Brücke and Schöneberg stations there is a low tunnel that leaves a gap of only 30 centimetres from the roof of the train. The 19-year-old was thrown off the roof as the train entered the tunnel and killed.
7 March 2014	United States – New York	Died	Collided with train	40–50	A man was found dead on the tracks at the Franklin Street station after getting struck by an oncoming 2 train. Suspected of subway surfing.
2 April 2014	United States – New York	Died	Collided with object	45	A person climbed up on top of a carriage, was riding on top of the train when their head hit an object and they were found on top of the train as it arrived at a station and they were pronounced dead.
13 April 2014	Russia – Moscow	Died	Collision with train	14	A person died when they were riding on the roof of a train and they fell from the roof of the train and landed underneath the wheels of the train.
April 2014	Ukraine – Kyiv Oblast	Injured	Electric shock	?, ?	Two people were riding on the roof of a train when they both received an electrical shock resulting in them receiving burns injuries and they were hospitalised.
21 April 2014	Ukraine – Kyiv	Died	Unconfirmed	16	A 16-year-old was on the roof of a train travelling on a bridge over a river when they received an electric shock and fell into the river. Their body was later recovered from the river.
14 May 2014	Russia – Moscow	Died	Electric shock	16	A 16-year-old was riding on the outside of a train, attempted to jump onto a platform, lost their balance and grabbed the overhead power line, which gave him an electric shock, killing him instantly.
25 May 2014	Russia – Moscow	Died	Electric shock	25	A person was seen riding on the roof of a train that was travelling towards a train station and then as the train approached this station they received an electric shock and died.
31 May 2014	India	Died	Fell under train	Teenager	A person was riding outside of the train and then attempted to surf with one foot on the platform. He then lost his balanced, slipped, and fell under the train. He was then killed instantly.
27 June 2014	Australia – Melbourne	Died	Electric shock	26	A 26-year-old was a passenger on a train as it arrived at Balaclava. He took off his clothes and climbed onto the roof of the train. As he was walking on top of the train he fell, landed on the train's electrical system and was killed.
July 2014	Ukraine – Kyiv	Injured	Fall	15	A person was riding on the last carriage of a metro train when they fell onto the railway line. They were taken to intensive care, regained consciousness and were stabilised. It was uncertain as to whether the person would live permanently with the effects of their injuries.
1 August 2014	Russia – Moscow	Died	Electric shock	14	A person climbed onto the roof of a train, began riding it and then received an electric shock and died.
25 September 2014	Australia – Brisbane	Died	Fall	34	A person was riding on the outside of a moving train at first and then was attempting to spray graffiti on it. And then was killed after they fell off from the train.
9 November 2014	Ukraine	Injured	Electric shock	14	A person who was train surfing on the roof of a train received an electric shock. They received burns to 65% percent of their body and were due to receive treatment in hospital for two months.
9 November 2014	United States – Connecticut	Died	Electric shock	21	A person was riding on the roof of a train when they received an electric shock and they were set on fire by the electric shock. As the train was arriving at a station it lost power and the person was found on the train roof and they were taken to hospital where they later died.
15 November 2014	Japan – Tokyo	Injured	Electric shock	?	A person was riding on the roof of a bullet train and then got a serious electric shock and fell onto the tracks.
21 November 2014	Russia – Moscow	Injured	Fall	18	A person was riding in between train carriages and as the train approached a station they attempted to climb to the roof, fell off onto the railway track and received a brain injury.
6 December 2014	Russia – Leningrad Oblast	Died	Electric shock	?	Before a train was due to depart, a person's body was found on the roof and it was thought to be possible that the person was intending to ride on the outside of the train as it travelled its route.
1 January 2015	Russia – Moscow	Died	Fall	17	A person was riding on a train in the space in between carriages and they went to take a photo and then they fell from the carriage and died from their injuries.
5 January 2015	Ukraine – Kyiv	Injured	Fall	14	A 14-year-old was riding on the back of a train at 60 kmh through a tunnel when they fell off and were then picked up by the driver of the next train, taken to hospital and treated for injuries.
15 January 2015	Germany – Berlin	Injured	Unconfirmed	14	A person was found with head injuries on the roof of a train. It was thought they were riding on the roof of the train and collided with a bridge.
18 February 2015	South Africa – Cape Town	Died	Electric shock	15	A person was riding on the roof of a train when they received an electric shock and were killed.
4 March 2015	Australia – Melbourne	Died	Fall	23	Surfing on a train in Melbourne when the train arrived, he fell off at the McKinnon railway station.
8 March 2015	United States – New York	Died	Fall	63	A person has died while standing in between the two subway cars on a 6 train in the Bronx after trying to attempt to urinate at the Pelham Bay Park station.
11 April 2015	Germany – Berlin	Died	Collided with object	19	A 19-year-old and 18-year-old jumped onto a train from a bridge and rode on top of the train roof. The 19-year-old hit a signal bridge at full speed and the 18-year-old held onto him on the roof of the train, carried the 19-year-old down onto a station platform where he was pronounced dead.
April 2015	India – Rajasthan	Died	Fall	?	A person died when they were riding on the roof of a train and they fell off.
27 May 2015	Russia – Moscow Oblast	Died	Electric shock	17	A 17-year-old was on the roof of a train, they touched a wire, received an electric shock and were killed.
27 May 2015	Russia – Moscow Oblast	Died	Electric shock	15	A person was riding on the roof of a train when they began to pull on the pantograph, received an electric shock and were killed.
1 June 2015	France – Champagne-sur-Oise	Died	Collided with Train	14	A 14-year-old was riding on the back of a train when they attempted to jump onto a station platform, slipped, fell underneath the last carriage and was killed.
June 2015	Ukraine – Kyiv	Died	Fall	12	A person was riding on the side of a freight car and they fell off and died as a result.
7 June 2015	Russia – Moscow	Died	Electric shock	Teenager	A person riding on the roof of a train received an electric shock and was killed.
17 July 2015	United States – New York	Injured	Suspected to fall	Unconfirmed	A person was surfing on an R train when they stumbled off the train in Sunset Park in Brooklyn.
21 July 2015	South Africa – Soweto	Died	Fall	19	A person was surfing on a train on his way to school in Soweto when he suddenly slipped and fell underneath the train wheels at the Chiawelo station.
30 July 2015	Ukraine – Kyiv	Injured	Electric shock	18	A person riding on the roof of a train received an electric shock that set the left side of their body on fire and they fell to the ground.
30 July 2015	Russia – Moscow	Died	Electric shock	15	A person died when they climbed onto the side of the last car of a train, climbed onto the roof and received an electric shock.
19 August 2015	Russia – Moscow	Died	Electric shock	Teenager	A person riding on the roof of a train received an electric shock and was killed.
7 September 2015	Ukraine – Kharkiv region	Died, Injured	Electric shock	Two people born in 2000	It was reported that "...the hook [train surfer] died after riding the car". Two people both climbed onto a freight carriage and received an electric shock and one of the people died and the second was taken to hospital and treated for burns.
8 September 2015	Ukraine – Kyiv	Injured	Electric shock	15	A person climbed onto the roof of a train and received an electric shock resulting in burns to 90% of their body.
9 September 2015	Ukraine – Kyiv	Injured	Electric shock	18	A person received burns injuries to their upper and lower limbs after receiving an electric shock from riding on the roof of a train.
31 October 2015	Russia – Moscow Oblast	Died	Electric shock	13	A person rode on the roof of a train and died of an electric shock.
6 December 2015	United States – New York	Injured	Collided with object	23	A person was injured when they were surfing on the side of a moving 2 train in Brooklyn and he struck and hit a pole at the Eastern Parkway–Brooklyn Museum station.
4 February 2016	Russia – Novosibirsk	Injured	Fall	14	A person jumped from a freight carriage towards a platform, fell under the wheels of the carriage, their leg was severed, they then crawled up onto the platform where they were found and taken to hospital. The injury resulted in them losing their leg.
10 April 2016	Russia – Tver Oblast	Injured	Fall	15	A person riding on the outside of a Lastochka train fell off at about 11:30pm and was discovered unconscious the next morning by a person who was passing by and they were treated in hospital for injuries including craniocerebral trauma, traumatic amputation of the foot and injuries to their arm.
14 April 2016	Ukraine – Kyiv Oblast	Died	Electric shock	16	A person climbed up onto the roof of a train, received three electric shocks, were taken to hospital where they received treatment for third degree burns to 60% of their body and multiple organ failure and after 11 days they died from their injuries.
6 May 2016	United States – New York	Died	Collided with object	24	A person was riding on top of a train car when his head hit a metal beam causing him to fall in between two carriages. A person on a station platform noticed the person lying unconscious between two train cars and they were taken to hospital and later died.
14 June 2016	Russia – Moscow Oblast	Died	Electric shock	14	A person died when it is thought they were riding on the roof of a train and they received an electric shock.
15 June 2016	Ukraine – Kyiv	Injured	Electric shock	15 15	Two people riding on the roof of a train both received an electric shock. One received burns to 25% of their body including their head, trunk, arms and buttocks.
15 July 2016	Russia – Moscow Oblast	Injured	Electric shock	17	A person was riding on the outside of a train when they feel from it and were seriously injured.
17 July 2016	Australia – Sydney	Injured	Fall	24	A train had arrived at a train station and a person climbed onto the back of the train and the train then departed and the person attempted to ride on the outside of the train. After the train had travelled about 500 metres the person fell off the train and onto the tracks. A train driver travelling in a second train going in the same direction saw the person lying on the tracks and they stopped the train and pulled the person into the drivers cabin. The person received minor injuries including lacerations to their hands and the back of their head.
August 2016	Russia – Leningrad Oblast	Injured	Electric shock	13	A person was riding on the roof of a train when the train came to a stop and they lost their balance, grabbed the over head power line, lost consciousness and fell over the side of the train. They received a closed head injury and burns to their left thigh and right hand.
2 August 2016	Russia – Moscow Oblast	Died	Electric shock	31	In May 2015 a person had been riding on the side of a train and as a result of this they received injuries including an open head injury and multiple fractures. The same person, in August 2016, died from an electric shock and their body was found on the roof of a train and it was thought that the person had been riding on the roof of the train.
3 August 2016	Russia – Omsk	Injured	Electric shock	14	A person was riding on the side of the train on the gangway connection between two carriages. They then moved to the roof of the train and while stopped at a station received an electric shock. They were taken to intensive care, regained consciousness and were treated for burns injuries.
16 August 2016	Russia – Moscow Oblast	Died	Electric shock	13 approx.	A person was riding on the roof of a train when they received an electric shock and were killed.
21 August 2016	Russia – Mikhnevo	Injured	Electric Shock	13	It is thought that a person was going to train surf and they climbed onto the roof of a freight train and received an electric shock and were taken to hospital for treatment.
23 August 2016	Russia – Serpukhov	Died	Electric shock	20	A person's body was found on railway tracks and it is thought that they had died from an electric shock and it is thought that they had been riding on a train when they received the electric shock.
September 2016	Germany – Stuttgart	Died	Collided with train	38	A person died when they climbed onto a freight train and collided with an oncoming train.
24 September 2016	Germany – Berlin	Died	Collided with object	22	A person was riding on the roof of a train when they collided with a bridge and were killed.
	Brazil – Fortaleza	Injured	Collided with train	?	A person was riding on the outside of a train when they fell off and a train ran over their leg and after receiving treatment their leg was amputated.
5 October 2016	United States – New York	Died	Collided with train	25	A 25-year-old was moving between subway cars when he attempted to climb on top of one, was clipped by an object, fell from the train and was killed.
18 November 2016	Australia – Melbourne	Injured	Fall	20s	A man in his 20s was train surfing in Melbourne when he threw himself off from the roof of the train and fell into the Yarra River as the train crossed a rail bridge in the Richmond area.
3 December 2016	United States – New York	Died	Collided with train	31	A 31-year-old, was riding inside a train when they began climbing up the gangway connection and whilst inside a tunnel the person collided with a pillar, fell off the train and was subsequently decapitated.
7 December 2016	United States – New York	Died	Collided with train	14	A person was riding in between the carriages of a train with a friend when they attempted to jump onto the platform. They missed the platform and landed on the track bed. As the train moved down the line it rolled over the person. They were rushed to hospital where they were pronounced dead.
31 December 2016	France – Paris	Died	Fall	17	Inspired by the movie Yamakasi (film), a 17-year-old British enthusiast - an acrobatic discipline popularized has died while trying to climb a Paris metro train. It has been reported that he may have fell off from the top of the train.
2017	Ukraine	Died	Electric shock and Unconfirmed	Child	It was reported that a person was "riding on the roof of a train, received burns of 45% of the body surface. The child could barely get out, [of the hospital where they had been treated] and soon he climbed back on the train, and the second time it was not possible to save him."
January 2017	Germany – Sachsenheim	Injured	Fall	15	A freight train was slowly moving past a station platform and a person jumped onto a small ladder on the side of a carriage and slipped and fell between the train and the platform and received multiple lacerations all over their body.
1 January 2017	France – Paris	Died	Collision with object	20	20 year-old Nye Newman was travelling on the inside of a train on New Years Eve in Paris when he went through the door that connects the train carriages and he attempted to take a photo when his head collided with an object on the side of the tunnel the train was travelling through. It has been commented that "...he definitely wasn’t train surfing when he died." and that the collision with the object on the side of the tunnel was only related to taking a photo.
16 January 2017	Russia – Nizhny Novgorod	Injured	Electric Shock	14	It was commented that a "14-year-old train surfer's ride on the roof of the Varya-Zavolzhye electric train ended with a closed craniocerebral injury and amputation of his arm due to multiple burns." The 14 year-old climbed onto the roof of a train and received an electric shock and then fell onto the railroad tracks and were being treated in intensive care.
22 January 2017	Ukraine – Kyiv	Injured	Electric shock	14	A train surfer received an electric shock on the roof of a train.
26 January 2017	Russia – St Petersburg	Died	Electric shock	Between 14 and 16	It is thought possible a person had been riding on a train and then received an electric shock and was killed.
29 January 2017	Ukraine – Kyiv	Injured	Electric shock	15	A person climbed onto the roof of a train and received an electric shock resulting in burns to 20% of their body.
17 February 2017	Italy – Liguria – Ventimiglia	Died	Electric shock	20s	A person died when they were riding on the roof of a train and they received an electric shock.
26 February 2017	United States – New York	Died	Collided with train	30s	A person was riding on the top of a train when they fell and the rear end of the train ran over them, killing them.
27 February 2017	Switzerland – Ticino	Died	Electric shock	20	A person died when they were travelling on the roof of a train and they received an electric shock.
4 March 2017	Russia – St Petersburg	Injured	Fall	15	A person was riding on the roof of a train when they fell from it and received serious injuries and were taken to hospital where they remained conscious.
10 April 2017	Ukraine – Kyiv	Injured	Fall	14	A person was holding onto the last carriage of a train, when they fell onto the rails and received injuries including concussion, closed trauma to the abdomen and chest, fractures and lacerations of soft tissue.
April 2017	Ukraine – Kyiv	Injured	Electric shock	18	A person was riding on the roof of a train, received an electric shock and fell from the train. They were taken to hospital and treated for burns to 40% of their body.
2 May 2017	France – Paris	Died	Electric shock	35	A person climbed on top of an Eurostar train at a Paris terminal station when he electrocuted by the cables and died at the scene moments later.
6 May 2017	Brazil – São Paulo	Injured	Electric shock	18	A person climbed up on top of a train, made contact with the power lines, their legs caught on fire and they received 2nd and 3rd degree burns. They were airlifted to hospital and underwent emergency surgery.
28 May 2017	Ukraine – Kyiv	Died	Unconfirmed	?	A person was riding on the roof of a train carriage, fell onto the tracks and was killed.
8 June 2017	Russia – Moscow	Died	Electric Shock	29	A person had died and there body was found on the roof of a train and it is thought that the person had been riding on the roof of the train when they received an electric shock.
8 June 2017	Russia – Moscow	Died	Unconfirmed	30s	A person climbed onto the back of a train, held onto a mirror and attempted to ride it to the next station. While riding on the train they received a fracture to the base of their skull and were killed.
8 June 2017	Russia – Omsk	Injured	Fall	10	A person climbed onto the last carriage of a train, held onto the hand rails and fell onto the railway track, receiving an open head injury and a fracture of the spine.
22 June 2017	Ukraine – Kyiv	Died	Collided with bridge	25	A person riding on the roof of a train collided with a bridge, fell off and was killed.
2 July 2017	Russia – Moscow Oblast	Injured	Fall	15	People who were passing by found a person lying unconscious near train tracks, covered in blood with an open head injury and in a critical condition. It was thought they had been riding on the outside of a train when they fell.
9 July 2017	Russia – St Petersburg	Died	Electric shock	?	A person was riding on the roof of a train when they received an electric shock and were killed.
18 August 2017	United States – New York	Died	Collided with train	36	A person was riding on the outside of a train when he was riding between cars, and then was crushed by a 2 train.
19 September 2017	United States – New York	Injured	Collided with object	13	A person was riding on a train, jumped off and hit the 'Do not enter' sign at the end of the platform, receiving injuries including ruptured testicles, cuts to their face and bruises to their stomach.
24 October 2017	France – Paris	Died	Collided with object	16	A person was lying down on the roof of a train, they sat up, were hit by the canopy of the roof of a railway station, fell off the train carriage and onto the tracks and died as a result of the incident.
28 October 2017	France – Paris	Injured	Fall	21	A person was riding on the roof of a train, attempted to climb down and fell, receiving an open head injury and bruises and were taken to hospital in a serious condition.
24 November 2017	United States – Pennsylvania	Died	Electric shock	15	A person has died when he was riding on the roof of a SEPTA train when he got himself electrocuted by the train's power lines and was killed.
1 December 2017	United Kingdom – Manchester	Died	Electric shock	23	A person has drunkenly climbed on top of a train in Manchester within the portion of London. He was then electrocuted after doing so and was killed instantly by the electric shocks.
	Ukraine	Injured	Electric shock	14	A person would ride on the outside of trains and on one occasion they were on the roof of a train and they touched the power line with their head and received an electric shock. Their body caught fire, they received burns to 65% of their body and they were treated at a burns unit for 6 weeks and they underwent surgery 6 times.
19 January 2018	United States – New York	Died	Fall	29	Surfing on an A train in Manhattan when he fell off at the 168th Street station and Broadway during the Rush Hour commutes.
19 February 2018	India – Chennai	Died	Electric shock	29	A person died after being drunk and attempted to climb on top of an EMU train and then was electrocuted to death by 60% burns and volts.
7 April 2018	Australia – Fremantle	Injured	Fall	Adult	A man was train surfing along the Fremantle line when he jumped off the Fremantle Railway Bridge in Western Australia and it seems to have that he had survived the fall.
8 April 2018	Russia – Moscow Oblast	Died	Fall	13	A person died when they were riding on the outside of a Lastochka train and they fell off to the ground and were killed.
May 2018	Russia – Moscow	Died	Unconfirmed	16	A 16-year-old died riding on the roof of a train.
6 May 2018	China – Chongqing	Died	Electric shock	22	A person was a photographer while riding on top of a train in Chongqing. He wanted to get videos and pictures of himself and successfully did it for the first time ever, but for the second time, he received electrical shocks from a high-voltage power cable by 80% and lapsed into a coma. He then died two days later.
14 May 2018	Russia – Moscow	Died	Electric shock	15	A person climbed onto the roof of a train through the gangway connection, received an electric shock and was killed.
15 May 2018	Ukraine – Poltava	Injured	Collided with train	Born 2007	A person attempted a jump onto a moving train and fell underneath the train and had their right foot amputated.
29 May 2018	United States – New York	Died	Collision with train	Born in 1990	Surfing on an E train in Queens when he fell between the two subway cars and onto the tracks while riding between train cars as it pulled into the 63rd Drive–Rego Park station.
10 June 2018	Ukraine – Kyiv	Injured	Electric shock	13	A person was a passenger on a moving train when they walked between the carriages and climbed up onto the roof. When on the roof of the train they received an electric shock and fell 5 metres. They were treated in hospital in a serious condition and doctors described their injuries as having a permanent effect on their life and those injuries included 2nd and 3rd degree burns to 55% of their body.
June 2018	Russia – Moscow	Died	Electric shock	Teenager	A person was riding on the roof of a train when they received an electric shock and were killed.
30 June 2018	Canada – Revelstoke	Injured	Collided with train	25	A person was riding on the outside of a train car when they fell off and sustained injuries after being hit by a moving train car. They were still conscious and able to talk when help arrived. They received injuries that resulted in full and partial limb amputations.
1 July 2018	Ukraine – Kyiv	Injured	Electric shock	Teenager	A person was riding on the roof of a train and then received an electric shock, fell from the train and received burns to 50% of their body.
14 July 2018	Russia – Leningrad Oblast	Died	Electric shock	18	A person riding on the roof of a train received an electric shock and died soon after.
21 July 2018	Russia – St Petersburg	Died	Electric shock	14	A person was riding on the roof of a train when it is thought that they raised their head resulting in them receiving an electric shock and killing them.
19 August 2018	Russia – Moscow	Died	Unconfirmed	14	A person had died and there body was found on the roof of a train with signs of electrical injury. It is thought that the person had been riding on the roof of the train and died of an electric shock.
30 August 2018	United States – New Jersey	Injured	Suspected fall	Teenager	Surfing on an NJ Transit light rail train when he tumbled off and fell at the Danforth Avenue station when the train was proceeding to leave the station to get to the next stop.
16 September 2018	United States – New York	Died	Collided with train	33	Surfing on a 4 train in Manhattan while urinating between the two subway cars, then he slipped, cracked his head open, and then died on the train at the 14th Street–Union Square station.
19 September 2018	United States – New York	Died	Electric shock	24	Surfing on a Metro-North Railroad train when he was coming home from the Yankee Stadium and then was electrocuted by the catenary wires.
30 September 2018	India – Kolkata	Died	Electric shock	Approximately 60	Surfing on an EMU train when he was electrocuted by an overhead electric traction wire after the stunt.
2019	Russia – Leningrad Oblast	Died	Electric shock	21	A person was riding on the roof of a train when they slipped and grabbed overhead power lines. They then fell off the train and later died before paramedics arrived at the scene.
23 January 2019	South Africa – Cape Town	Died	Electric shock	30s	A person riding on the roof of a train received a fatal electric shock.
5 February 2019	South Africa – Cape Town	Died	Electric shock	?	A person riding on the roof of a train suffered a fatal electric shock.
13 February 2019	Russia – Moscow Oblast	Died, Injured	Fall	13, 9	Two people had been riding on the roof of a train for the duration that it took the train to travel to one station and they both fell off. One of them died from the fall and the second received a closed head injury and an open leg fracture.
19 February 2019	South Africa – Durban	Injured	Electric shock	30s	A person riding outside of a train received an electric shock when he came in contact with the main overhead cable.
20 February 2019	South Africa – Durban	Injured	Electric shock	21	A person riding on top of a train was electrocuted, but luckily, he was found to be alive afterwards.
21 March 2019	United Kingdom – London	Died	Electric shock	27, 26	Two people climbed onto a flat-bed container carriage and then one of them jumped across to a white cylinder when they both received a fatal electric shock from overhead power lines.
5 April 2019	Portugal – Porto	Injured	Fall	Four people between 15 and 16	Four people were riding on the outside of a train and they all fell off and were all injured with between one and two of them being seriously injured.
13 April 2019	Ukraine – Kharkiv Oblast	Died	Fall	12	A person was holding on to a train when they fell off, received injuries including amputation of their lower leg and fractures. Passers by called an ambulance and the person was taken to hospital, but died two days later.
May 2019	Ukraine – Kyiv	Injured	Electric Shock	13	A person climbed onto the roof of a train at a train station and attempted to ride on the roof of the train and they received an electric shock from the overhead power lines. They were unconsciousness and received burns to 45% of their body and were taken to hospital where they regained consciousness.
22 May 2019	Russia – Moscow Oblast	Died	Electric shock	Born 2001	A person was riding on the roof of a train when they touched the current collector and were killed by an electric shock.
6 June 2019	Russia – Rabochiy Poselok	Died	Electric Shock	?	A person who had died was found lying on the roof of a train and it appeared as though they had received an electric shock and it was thought that the person had been train surfing.
8 June 2019	Russia – Leningrad Oblast	Died	Electric Shock	21	A person riding on the roof of a train received an electric shock and was killed.
July 2019	Russia – Moscow	Injured	Fall	13	A person was riding on a train when they received an injury that resulted in a significant displacement of bone fragments in their forearms. Following an operation and 3 months rehabilitation the person will regain movement in their hands.
4 August 2019	Russia – Tver Oblast	Died	Electric shock	Born 2001	A man riding on the roof of a Sapsan train received an electric shock that .
August 2019	Russia – Moscow	Died	Unconfirmed	13	A person died riding on the roof of a train.
September 2019	Brazil – Guarujá	Died	Fall	16	A person was riding on the roof of a train when they fell off and they were taken to hospital where they had their leg amputated and then later died.
23 November 2019	United States – New York	Died	Collided with object	14	A person was riding on the outside of a train when their head hit a metal object, knocking them onto the railway track, killing them.
12 December 2019	Russia – Krasnoyarsk	Died	Electric shock	14	A person was riding outside of a train in Krasnoyarsk when he received and electric shock from a total of 27,000 volts of electricity.
6 January 2020	United States – New York	Died	Collided with train	74	Was riding on the outside of an N train in Manhattan after walking in between them, causing her to topple off and get crushed by a Queens-bound train at the 49th Street station.
12 January 2020	United States – California	Died	Collided with train	21	Was surfing on Muni Light-rail train couplers between Bayshore Boulevard and Sunnydale Avenue in San Francisco. Fell off and was struck by the second train car where he died at the scene.
3 February 2020	Taiwan – Taichung	Injured	Electric shock	21	A 21-year-old Taiwanese man was a passenger on the TRA Carriage train. He first began harassing a woman, then tried to attack another man, and then climbed on the roof of the train. Then finally, he got himself electrocuted by the train's power lines, his clothes were burst into flames, and he was sustained in critical condition.
4 February 2020	Belgium – Antwerp	Injured	Fall	34	A person attempted to open the doors of a departing train and the doors of the train closed and the train began to leave the station. The person then jumped onto the train as it left attempting to ride on the outside of the train and they fell between the platform and the train. They were found lying on the railway track and they received serious injuries and remained in a critical condition in hospital.
19 February 2020	United States – New York	Injured	Collided with object	32	Was surfing on top of an M train in Brooklyn as it pulled into the Myrtle Avenue–Broadway station when he collided with an overhead beam and fell in between the cars, getting his lag jammed, and then lost his foot.
2 March 2020	South Africa – Durban	Died	Electric shock	16	A person has died after he received electric shocks on the railway while he was train-surfing, and the body was discovered at the Umgeni station.
4 March 2020	Russia – Moscow Oblast	Died	Electric shock	Teenager	A person had died and their body was found on the roof of a train at a train station. It is thought possible that the person was riding on the roof of the train and while on the roof received an electric shock and died.
2 April 2020	United States – Washington, D.C.	Died	Unconfirmed	Unconfirmed	A person jumped on to the roof of a moving train and was found dead on the tracks two stations later.
13 May 2020	Russia – Vladimir Oblast	Died	Collided with object	13	A person was riding a train and then fell underneath the wheels of the train and was taken to intensive care with severe injuries.
23 May 2020	Russia – Moscow Oblast	Died	Collided with train/Fall	19	As a train had begun leaving a railway station a person grabbed onto the train with their hands and travelled for a few metres before they fell from the train and died.
1 June 2020	Russia – Moscow	Injured	Electric shock	13	A person was riding on the roof of a train when they received an electric shock and they were taken to a burn intensive care unit.
17 June 2020	Russia – Moscow	Injured	Fall	17	A person was riding on the outside of a train when they fell from it and were injured.
17 June 2020	Russia – Moscow Oblast	Died	Electric shock	Teenager	A person was on the roof of a train and as the train moved they received an electric shock and were killed.
7 July 2020	South Africa – Durban	Injured	Electric shock	15	A person received critical injuries when he was riding on the roof of a train in KZN, and he received an electric shock, and then he was taken to a hospital.
August 2020	Russia	Injured	Electric shock	18	A person was riding on the roof of a Sapsan train when at one point they received an electric shock. They were removed from the roof and taken to hospital and were to undergo surgery to have their leg amputated.
23 August 2020	Russia – Moscow	Died	Electric shock	13	A person died when they were riding on the roof of a train and they received an electric shock and their body was found lying on the railway track.
27 August 2020	Russia – Moscow Oblast	Injured	Fall	11	A person was injured when they riding on the step of the last carriage of a train and they began taking pictures and then fell to the ground to the side of the railway track. Almost two days after they had fallen from the train the person was found lying unconscious in a thicket not far from the railway track. They were showing the effects of severe hypothermia and they had not had any food or water during this period lying beside the track. The injuries they received included a head injury, an occiput wound, a bruised chest, a closed fracture of the pelvic bones, fractures to both ankles, a bruised cervical vertebra and wounds on both hands.
31 August 2020	Russia – St Petersburg	Died	Unconfirmed	22	A person died when it is thought that they most likely either fell from a moving train or were run over by a train. A video camera was close by where their body was found lying inside a train tunnel and their backpack was found inside a subway train carriage.
25 September 2020	Russia – Domodedovo	Died	Electric Shock	Teenager	A person died when they climbed onto the roof of a train through the space between the carriages and was riding on the roof when they received an electric shock.
28 September 2020	Ukraine – Kyiv	Died	Collided with train	29	A person was riding on the roof of a train and they fell from it and collided with a train and died from multiple injuries.
7 November 2020	South Africa – Durban	Died	Electric shock	17	A person has died while he was riding on the roof of a train and then he received an electric shock.
13 November 2020	Australia – Sydney	Died	Fall	20	A person died in a train tunnel and it was speculated that the person had been riding on the outside of a train when they died.
26 December 2020	Russia – St Petersburg	Injured	Collided with train	11	A person was riding on the outside of a freight train when they fell underneath the wheels of the train. The driver of another train that was passing by saw the person and they had been lying beside the tracks for 30 mins and were still conscious and one leg had been amputated by the freight train and their second was severely injured. Their second leg was later amputated in hospital.
26 March 2021	Russia – Moscow	Died	Unconfirmed	Teenager	Two people were riding on the roof of a train when they received injuries and one of them died and the second received minor injuries.
2 June 2021	Russia – Moscow Oblast	Died	Electric shock	18	A person had died and their body was found on the roof of a train; it is thought they had been riding on the roof of the train when they received an electric shock.
2 October 2021	United States – New York	Died	Collided with train	32	A man fell off a train while riding on its roof and was struck by an oncoming train.
21 March 2022	Italy – Cambiano	Injured	Electric shock	15	A person was electrocuted when he climbed and rode on top of a moving train at Cambiano to take pictures stated by one of his friends.
7 April 2022	India – New Delhi	Died	Electric shock	16	A person climbed on top of a train and was riding on top of the train while it was moving. He was tending to take a selfie, but was electrocuted and was killed instantly.
17 April 2022	Russia – Tarasovskaya	Died	Electric shock	13	A train arrived at the Tarasovskaya station in Moscow when a person was found lying on the roof the train. They had been riding on the roof of the train when they received an electric shock and died.
13 May 2022	India – Arakkonam	Died	Electric shock/Fall	68	A person climbed onto the top of a train in Arakkonam. He attempted to commit suicide by touching an overhead power line, but the police arrived at the scene. He then touched the ground after jumping off of the roof but then died moments later after the investigation was in progress.
23 June 2022	United States – New York	Injured	Head hit structure	15	Surfing on a 7 train in Queens when he struck his head while he was on the roof in Corona, Queens at the 111th Street station.
24 June 2022	Germany – Berlin	Died/Injured	Collided with signal brackets/Electric shock	15, 16, 23, and 37	Surfing on an S-Bahn train in Berlin and in Steglitz-Zehlendorf when 3 out of 4 people received several injuries. A person aged 15 years old was killed, while the person aged 16 years old was unharmed, and two other people aged 23 and 37 years old were taken to a hospital after being completely under shock.
29 August 2022	United States – New York	Injured	Suspected to fall	15	Surfing on an R train in Queens at the Jackson Heights–Roosevelt Avenue/74th Street station where he lost his balance and lost one of his arms.
11 September 2022	India – Paramakudi	Died	Electric shock	22	Youth was injured at first after raising a flag and after climbing on the top of a railway engine train but then died moments later from the injury.
11 October 2022	Switzerland – Geneva	Died	Electric shock	18	Teenage girl died of an electric shock after tripping her head on an electricity wire on the roof of a passenger train. The current also passed through her friend, who got heavy burns and is injured.
1 December 2022	United States – New York	Died	Electric shock/Fall	15	A teenager fell off a train while riding on its roof and was subsequently electrocuted.
23 December 2022	India – Tamil Nadu	Died	Electric shock	27	A man who climbed on top of a parked train while trying to train surf at the Chennai Central railway station was electrocuted after he came in contact with the high voltage cables.
20 February 2023	United States – New York	Died	Head hit structure	15	15-year-old boy killed subway surfing on the J train near the Williamsburg Bridge.
4 March 2023	United States – New York	Died	Fall	14	Teenager was spotted on top of a 5 train when he possibly slipped between two train cars near the East 180th Street station.
1 May 2023	Canada – Toronto	Died	Head hit structure	15	Was surfing on top of a TTC subway train in Toronto when he hit his head with either by a bridge or on top of the car at the Warden station. Was pronounced dead at the scene 2 days later from the injury.
17 May 2023	United States – New York	Died	Head hit structure	15	Was riding on top of train car in Staten Island with friends. Hit his head on a structure, was rushed to the hospital but died from the injury.
20 June 2023	United States – Washington, D.C.	Died	Fall	15	Was riding on top of a Shady Grove-bound Red Line train between Brookland and Rhode Island Avenue when he fell under the wheels of the train and onto the track.
22 June 2023	United States – New York	Died/injured	Collided with tunnels/Fall	Both 14	Both teenage boys were seen surfing on top of a Manhattan-bound L train in Brooklyn when they were thrown from the trains. One of the teens died at the scene but the other teen was said to have survived and reported to be in stable condition.
29 June 2023	United States – New York	Died	Fall	14	Was seen surfing on top of a 7 train in Queens when it was reported he tumbled off the train car. He was taken to a hospital where he died of a traumatic head injury.
29 July 2023	Scotland – Lanarkshire	Injured	Electric shock	14	Was riding on top of a freight train in Lanarkshire when he reached out and touched an overhead wire and was electrocuted. He was sustained in critical condition.
18 August 2023	United States – Virginia	Died	Collided with train/Fall	25	Was seen trying to jump and ride on top of a moving train in Manassas, Virginia when he instead fell underneath the train and was struck by it.
19 September 2023	Mexico – Mexico City	Died/Injured	Collision and fall	Migrants, Adult	The railway company Ferromex halted the trains when many migrants were injured, but some of them were killed when they stood too close to the tracks, with some of them on top of the trains.
15 November 2023	United States – New York	Died	Head hit structure	19	Was riding or surfing between train cars on an E train in Queens when he slipped and fell between the two subway cars and was hit by something unknown while the train was proceeding to stop at the Sutphin Boulevard–Archer Avenue–JFK Airport station in Jamaica.
12 January 2024	United States – New York	Died	Collided with train	14	Surfing on an F train in Brooklyn at Avenue N. Slipped and fell off train and was then struck by an oncoming train.
23 January 2024	United States – New York	Died	Collided with train	50	Surfing on top of a Q train in Brooklyn near the Prospect Park station shortly before he was hit and was struck by an oncoming train.
29 January 2024	United States – California	Died	Collided with train	19	Surfing on a BART train near the Balboa Park station where he fell off and was struck by an oncoming train.
30 January 2024	Australia – Sydney	Injured	Fall	17	It was commented that a 17-year-old had "fallen from a train" and also that "NSW Ambulance, however, indicated the boy was a passenger on the same train that hit him." They received head injuries and multiple fractures and were taken to hospital where they remained in a serious but stable condition.
9 February 2024	France – Paris	Died	Electric shock	25	A person who was a migrant climbed on top of an Eurostar train. He crossed on the tracks and on the platform and climbed on top of the train, but he was electrocuted, turned into a fireball, and then was killed.
13 February 2024	United States – California	Died	Fall	15	Surfing on a BART train near the Balboa Park and Daly City Bart stations where he fell off the train and died at the scene.
1 March 2024	United States – Maryland	Died	Suspected to fall	12	Surfing on a Metro train near Silver Spring Metro Station. Found dead soon after.
10 March 2024	United States – New York	Injured	Fall	14	Surfing on a Brooklyn-bound F train where he fell at the Fourth Avenue/Ninth Street station. He was reported to be conscious and injured.
22 April 2024	Canada – Toronto	Injured	Suspected to have been hit with object	15	Surfing on a GO train in Toronto with 3 other teens. Sustained several injuries but is reported to be in the hospital.
13 May 2024	Russia – Moscow Oblast	Injured	Electric shock	15	A 15 year-old was surfing on a train in Elektrougli in Moscow when he was electrocuted in the groins while making a social media video. They fell from the train roof onto the rails and were being treated in hospital in a serious condition.
17 May 2024	United States – New York	Injured	Fall	14	Surfing on a 7 train in Queens when he fell off the train while it was approaching the 103rd Street–Corona Plaza station as the next stop.
9 June 2024	United States – New York	Injured	Collided with object	14	Surfing on a 7 train in Queens, while train was arriving at 111th Street station, the teen's head struck a beam. Status unknown.
14 June 2024	United States – New York	Died/Injured	Fall	13 and 15	Two teenage boys were surfing on a 6 train in the Bronx when one fell off between Westchester Square–East Tremont Avenue and Middletown Road stations and the other fell at the Morrison Avenue–Soundview station. The 13-year-old was killed and the 15-year-old was in critical condition.
7 July 2024	India – Kochi	Died	Electric shock	17	A person climbed on top of a train and was standing on top of it, but then he received an electric shock and then died at the scene.
15 July 2024	Germany – Berlin	Injured	Collided with object	18	Surfing on a U-Bahn train with 2 friends in Berlin at the Warschauer Straße station when the 18-year old was caught in a metal scaffold and was knocked down onto the tracks after the train left the station. The two other teenagers have escaped.
25 July 2024	Belgium – Brussels	Died/Injured	Electric shock/Fall	19, 19, and 20?	Three people were surfing on a Brussels railway train in Laeken when two 19 year-olds died from being electrocuted and the fall, while the third person sustained minor injuries.
26 July 2024	United States – New York	Died	Suspected fall	15	Found on train bed on Beach 90th Street station in Queens. Suspected of subway surfing.
6 August 2024	United States – New York	Died	Fall	24	Riding between subway cars on a 3 train in Brooklyn when she slipped and fell between the two subway cars when the train was heading to the Grand Army Plaza station.
16 September 2024	United States – New York	Died	Fall	11	Surfing on a G train when he fell off near the Fourth Avenue/Ninth Street station in Park Slope, Brooklyn. Dead at the scene.
25 September 2024	United States – Mississippi	Died	Collided with train	Unconfirmed	Was found lying on the tracks in Ocean Springs and did not hear the train's warning of approach. Possibly train surfing.
27 September 2024	India – Chennai	Injured	Electric shock	26	A person climbed onto the top of a train and began riding on top of it. He came in contact with a high-voltage power cable passing over the train, and suffered an electric shock, sustaining 45 percent burns.
1 October 2024	Russia – Murmansk Oblast	Died (and then Injured)	Electric shock	14	A person was on the roof of a train when his hand touched an overhead power line and they received an electric shock and their hair and clothes caught on fire and they collapsed onto the roof of the train. They received severe burns and electrical injuries and were taken to hospital where they were put in intensive care and were reported to be conscious. It was commented that after the initial flash from the electric shock it was at first thought that they had died until emergency services found the person on the roof of the train and saw that they were still alive.
23 October 2024	United States – New York	Died	Fall	13	Surfing on an M train when he fell off at the Forest Avenue station in Ridgewood, Queens, just days after his 13th birthday.
24 October 2024	United States – New York	Injured	Suspected fall	20	Surfing on a 5 train in the Bronx when he fell off the top of the train and was struck by an unknown structure at the East 180th Street station.
26 October 2024	Austria – Vienna	Died/Injured	Collided with bridge	16, 17, and 18	Four friends on a Line U4 train were train-surfing and filming when two sustained critical injuries at Schönbrunn station after they collided with a railway bridge. The 17-year-old died three days later, while the 18-year-old died a week later. The 13-year-old was unharmed and the 16-year-old received minor injuries.
27 October 2024	United States – New York	Died/Injured	Collided with train/Fall	13 and 14	Both teenage girls were surfing on a 7 train in Queens around 10:50 pm when they both fell and were hit by a Manhattan-bound train at the 111th Street station. One girl was killed at the scene while the other was taken to a hospital in critical condition.
7 November 2024	United States – New York	Injured	Collided with train	20s	Surfing on a 2 train in Manhattan when she fell between the two subway cars and onto the tracks at the 135th Street station in the Lenox Avenue section in Harlem. She lost her arm and her leg.
19 November 2024	Brazil – Rio	Injured	Electric shock	13	Surfing on top of a carriage train in Rio de Janeiro when he received electric shocks twice in one incident at the Anchieta station. He was then later taken to a hospital.
20 November 2024	United States – New York	Died	Collided with train	Unconfirmed	Was most likely subway surfing on a 2 train in the Bronx and then was struck by an oncoming train near the Third Avenue–149th Street station.
25 November 2024	United States – New York	Died	Collided with train	Born in the 1980s	A person was found dead on the tracks at the Clinton–Washington Avenues station after getting struck by an oncoming C train. It was speculated they had been subway surfing.
29 November 2024	United States – New York	Injured	Collided with train	Born in the 1990s	It was speculated that a person had been subway surfing when they were struck by an oncoming train at the Flatbush Avenue–Brooklyn College station. They were found on the tracks after the collision and then was taken to a nearby hospital.
8 December 2024	United States – New York	Injured	Suspected fall	13	A teenager was spotted surfing on top of a 5 train in the Bronx to where he possibly injured himself at the Baychester Avenue station.
25 December 2024	United States – New York	Died	Collided with train	49	A 49 year-old died while he was surfing between train cars on a 6 train in Manhattan during Christmas Day. While smoking, he tumbled off the train and onto the tracks, and was crushed to death at the 77th Street station.
6 January 2025	Australia – Sydney	Injured	Fall	14	A 14-year-old was injured when they were standing on the outside of a moving Waratah train in Sydney and then they fell onto the tracks. They were treated for serious arm and torso injuries and were taken to hospital in a serious condition and they also received injuries to their back and head.
21 January 2025	United States – New York	Injured	Fall	15	A 15 year-old was injured when they were surfing on a 5 train in the Bronx and he tumbled off and fell onto the tracks, receiving a head injury near the Gun Hill Road station.
22 January 2025	India – Odisha	Died	Electric shock	55	A 55-year-old died after they came into contact with a live wire after he climbed on top of a moving tanker on a goods train in Odisha when he was returning home from Sikandarpur.
25 January 2025	United States – New York	Injured	Suspected to fall	16	A 16 year-old was surfing on an F train in Queens when he tumbled off the train and fell onto the platform at the Briarwood station.
2 February 2025	United States – New York	Died	Fall	35	A person was riding between train cars on an E train in Queens when he slipped and fell onto the tracks and died at the Forest Hills–71st Avenue station.
2 March 2025	Cambodia – Krong Battambang	Injured	Suspected fall	21	A 21 year-old sustained serious injuries after he climbed onto the roof of a Cambodian train in Krong Battambang with 1 other man and 1 woman. He sustained injures to his feet and his legs as a result of train surfing. He may have lost his leg afterwards.
13 March 2025	United States – New York	Died	Collided with train	Adult	An adult was found dead at the 103rd Street–Corona Plaza station after getting struck by an oncoming train. Either he jumped onto the tracks or he was surfing on a 7 express train in Queens.
13 March 2025	Ukraine – Kyiv	Injured	Electric shock	12	A 12 year-old was on the roof of a train when he touched an electric wire, receiving a 27,000-volt shock. He was seen at the Kyiv-Volynskyi station lying between two carriages, engulfed in flames, before being extinguished with a fire extinguisher. While some news channels initially reported that the boy had died in the hospital, his mother later confirmed that he was in critical condition.
14 March 2025	United States – New York	Injured	Fell under train	13	Surfing on a 7 train in Queens when he fell underneath the train at the 111th Street station in the section of Corona.
17 March 2025	United States – New York	Injured	Fall	13	Whilst riding on an R train in Brooklyn, a 13 year-old fell off at the Bay Ridge Avenue station while the train was approaching the station.
27 March 2025	United States – New York	Died	Fall	56	A 56 year-old was riding between train cars on a 2 train in Manhattan when he fell off between the second and the third subway cars while riding in between them at the Times Square–42nd Street station.
30 March 2025	Italy – Verona	Died	Electric shock/Fall	19	A boy was found dead on the tracks at the Porta Vescovo station when he was electrocuted after climbing on top of a freight train, touching the power lines.
2 April 2025	Bangladesh – Dhaka	Died/Injured	Fall	18, 20, 22, and 25	Two people were killed, and two others were injured when they were riding on the roof of a moving train and filming TikTok videos and then they all fell off from the roof of the train.
5 April 2025	Taiwan – Keelung	Injured	Suspected fall	40s	A person was injured when they wedged themself onto the coupler connection between the third and fourth cars on a Taroko Express Train #448 from Taipei to Keelung and they began riding on the train and they were later found lying on the tracks.
14 April 2025	India – Jammu & Kashmir	Died	Electric shock	24	A 24 year-old died when they climbed on top of a passenger train in Jammu and Kashmir's Samba district and they received an electric shock.
15 April 2025	United States – New York	Died	Collided with train/Fall	30s	A person died when they were surfing on a 1 train in the Bronx and they fell off between the train cars near the 238th Street station around 3:18 AM. They were found lying dead between two train cars.
27 April 2025	Germany – Berlin	Died	Collided with bridge	17 and 18	Two teenage boys were surfing on an S1 train in Berlin when they both hit a signal bridge while the train was moving approximately 60 kilometers. They both died at the scene moments later.
7 May 2025	Canada – Chilliwack	Died	Collided with train	28	It is confirmed that a person was struck by an oncoming train on the railroad tracks in Chilliwack. Suspected of train surfing.
8 June 2025	United States – Pennsylvania	Died	Collided with train/Fall	68	A 68 year-old attempted to walk and ride between train cars on a SEPTA train when he slipped, fell, and was struck by an oncoming train.
9 June 2025	India – Thane	Died/Injured	Collision and fall	Multiple, unknown	Five people were killed and seven were injured after two passing trains experienced a "sudden jerk" at a sharp curve, causing passengers hanging onto to the doorways to collide with each other and fall.
16 June 2025	United States – New York	Injured	Fall	14–16	A person aged 14–16 years old was riding outside of a 5 train in the Bronx when he slipped and fell onto the tracks and was sustained in critical condition at the Baychester Avenue station. He was then rushed to a hospital.
20 June 2025	Ukraine – Kyiv	Injured	Collided with tunnel	19	A blogger sustained serious injuries while attempting to film a video of himself on a metro car in Kyiv. He collided with the equipment in the tunnel, and then suffered a fractured thigh, concussion, and numerous bruises.
21 June 2025	Ukraine – Vinnytsia	Injured	Electric shock	13	A person was injured when he received electrical shocks to his body on the roof of a freight train. He then was taken to the hospital later on.
22 June 2025	Ukraine – Kyiv	Died	Electric shock	Adult	A person was riding on the roof of an electric train when he touched a contact network that causes him to get electrocuted. Was pronounced dead at the scene.
4 July 2025	United States – New York	Died	Fall	15	Surfing on a 7 train in Queens during Independence Day at the Queensboro Plaza station when he fell from the top of the train and died.
5 July 2025	Ukraine – Chernihiv Oblast	Died/Injured	Electric shock	15 and 19	Two people were on the roof of a railway car in Nizhyn when they both received electric shocks to their bodies and were suffering from the electrocution. A 15-year-old boy was killed, and a 19-year-old girl was in intensive care after being injured.
6 July 2025	India – Mumbai	Died	Electric shock	16	A person was injured when they climbed onto the roof of a train and they came in to contact with the overhead power lines and they received an electric shock. They received burns to 60% of their body and received multiple fractures. They then died 6 days later.
17 July 2025	Russia – Askiz	Injured	Electric shock	15	It was commented that "An accident involving a minor train surfer occurred at the Askiz railway station..." and two teenagers climbed onto the roof of a train and moved between the cars and at one point a 15 year-old received an electric shock from the overhead power lines. They received burns to 70% of their body and were being treated in hospital in a serious condition.
11 August 2025	India – Mumbai	Injured	Electric shock	30	A person was injured when he came in contact with a high-voltage overhead wire after riding on top of a moving local train at the Vashi railway station.
13 August 2025	India – Chennai	Injured	Electric shock	23	A person was injured when he received burns by 75% of his body while riding on top of a moving express train near Tambaram.
26 August 2025	Belgium – Brussels	Died	Collided with train/Fall	Unconfirmed	A person has died when they were surfing on top of a train in Brussels. While clinging onto the moving train, he fell and was struck by an oncoming train, killing them at the Brussels-North railway station.
10 September 2025	United States – New York	Injured	Fall	Teenager	It was speculated that a person that fell onto the tracks was most likely subway surfing on an N train in Queens when they fainted and fell onto the tracks at the Queensboro Plaza station. A conductor later saved him, and the individual recovered afterwards.
12 September 2025	India – Nagpur	Injured	Electric shock	20s	A person was injured when they were surfing on top of a Humsafar express train on platform 7 at the Nagpur railway station.
28 September 2025	Australia – Melbourne	Died	Fall	18	A person died when they were surfing on the rear of a tram and they lost their grip and fell off whilst it was still moving.
29 September 2025	Australia – Sydney	Injured	Fall	13	A person was injured after he climbed on top of a moving train and attempted to train surf in Sydney's south. He sustained critical injuries as a result of train surfing.
4 October 2025	United States – New York	Died	Collided with object	12 and 13	Two teenage girls were surfing on a J train in Brooklyn when they were found unconscious at the Marcy Avenue station around 3:10 am after they were likely hit by an overhead beam. They both died on the roof of the train moments later.
10 October 2025	Russia – Moscow	Died/Injured	Electric shock	Three Teenagers	Three teenagers climbed onto the roof of a train and began riding on it when all three received an electric shock from overhead power lines. One of the teenagers died at the scene, a second had their arm amputated and a third was taken to hospital in a critical condition.
15 November 2025	Austria	Died	Fall	15	A Czech woman died in Austria near the town of Blindenmarkt after falling from the exterior of a moving ICE T train while "train surfing."
7 December 2025	Ukraine – Kyiv	Died	Electric shock	16	A person died when they were surfing on a train in Kyiv and received an electric shock at the Vydubychi railway station. Sooner or later, they were pronounced dead at the scene.
11 December 2025	United States – New York	Injured	Fall	14	Surfing on a B train in Brooklyn with 3 other people when it was thought that he have fallen off from the train roof and landed on the tracks near the Avenue J station.
24 January 2026	Germany – Berlin	Died	Electric shock	17	While whilst riding on a train in Berlin, a person trying to retrieve their e-cigarette from the train tracks, while getting their vape back, he touched the rail, received an electric shock, and then was killed.
11 February 2026	Switzerland – Beinwil am See – Hitzkirch	Died/Injured	Electric shock	17 and 18	Two people were riding on top of a moving train between Beinwil am See and Hitzkirch when they both received electric shocks. The 18-year-old was killed, and the 17-year-old was critically injured.
19 March 2026	Australia – Sydney	Injured	Fall	13	A 13-year-old boy was injured when he was surfing on a train in Sydney. It was thought that he had fallen off from inside a moving train and onto the tracks near Engadine.
21 March 2026	Russia – Moscow	Died	Electric shock	14	14-year-old Dasha Fomina died from electrocution at the Kuskovo station in Moscow while performing a stunt for TikTok. He was struck by a high-voltage electric shock while clambering between carriages on the train's roof and subsequently fell to the ground.
23 March 2026	Russia – Moscow	Injured	Electric shock	14	A 14-year-old schoolboy was burned alive after being electrocuted whilst "train surfing" in Russia.
29 March 2026	Ukraine – Kyiv	Died/Injured	Electric shock	Three teenagers	Three teenagers were surfing on a stationary train in Kyiv when all three of them received electric shocks. One of the teenagers died at the scene, while the other two are hospitalized after they were injured by the shocks.
1 April 2026	Ukraine – Kyiv	Died	Fall	Teenager	Three people were surfing on an electric train in Kyiv when one of them fell off from the top of train train and died at the scene. The other two were unharmed.
22 May 2026	United States – New York	Died/Injured	Fall	14 and 18	Two men were surfing on a J train at the Williamsburg Bridge in Brooklyn & Manhattan when they both fell off from the train. A 14-year-old was killed, and an 18-year-old was in critical condition.
10 June 2026	Ukraine – Kyiv	Died	Electric shock	13	Three teenagers climbed on top of a rail tankers train and was riding on top of its roof when the 13-year-old was then electrocuted and died from his injuries.
13 June 2026	Australia – Sydney	Injured	Fall	16	A 16-year old was riding on the roof of a Tangara Model train, which is also known as a T-set, when they fell from it and were taken to hospital where they remained in a critical condition.
25 June 2026	United States – Connecticut	Died	Electric shock	33	A person climbed and then rode on top of a Metro-North Railroad train near the Southport station in Connecticut when he then came in contact with the electrified overhead catenary wire and was pronounced dead at the scene.
22 July 2026	United States – New York	Injured	Collided with object	16	A person was injured when she was surfing on an A train in Queens when she possibly struck and hit a beam on the way at the Broad Channel station.
23 July 2026	Ukraine – Kyiv	Died	?	14	The body of a 14-year-old was found after he was most likely pronounced dead at the scene. It's unclear on how the incident occurred.
11 August 2026	United States – Massachusetts	Injured	Fall	12	Surfing on an MBTA Red Line train in Boston when the train was proceeding to leave the JFK-UMass train station just before 1:00 a.m., but then the boy fell off and suffered a serious, but non-life-threatening head injury.
2 November 2026	United States – New York	Injured	Collided with train	14	Surfing on a Queens-bound J express train when he fell off from the roof of the train and then was hit by an oncoming train at the Hewes Street station on the J/M/Z lines. He remains in critical condition.

== See also ==
- Car surfing
- Elevator surfing
- List of graffiti and street-art injuries and deaths
- List of selfie-related injuries and deaths
- Rail suicide
- Skitching
- Train surfing
