= Ghost riding =

Dancing around an unmanned moving vehicle

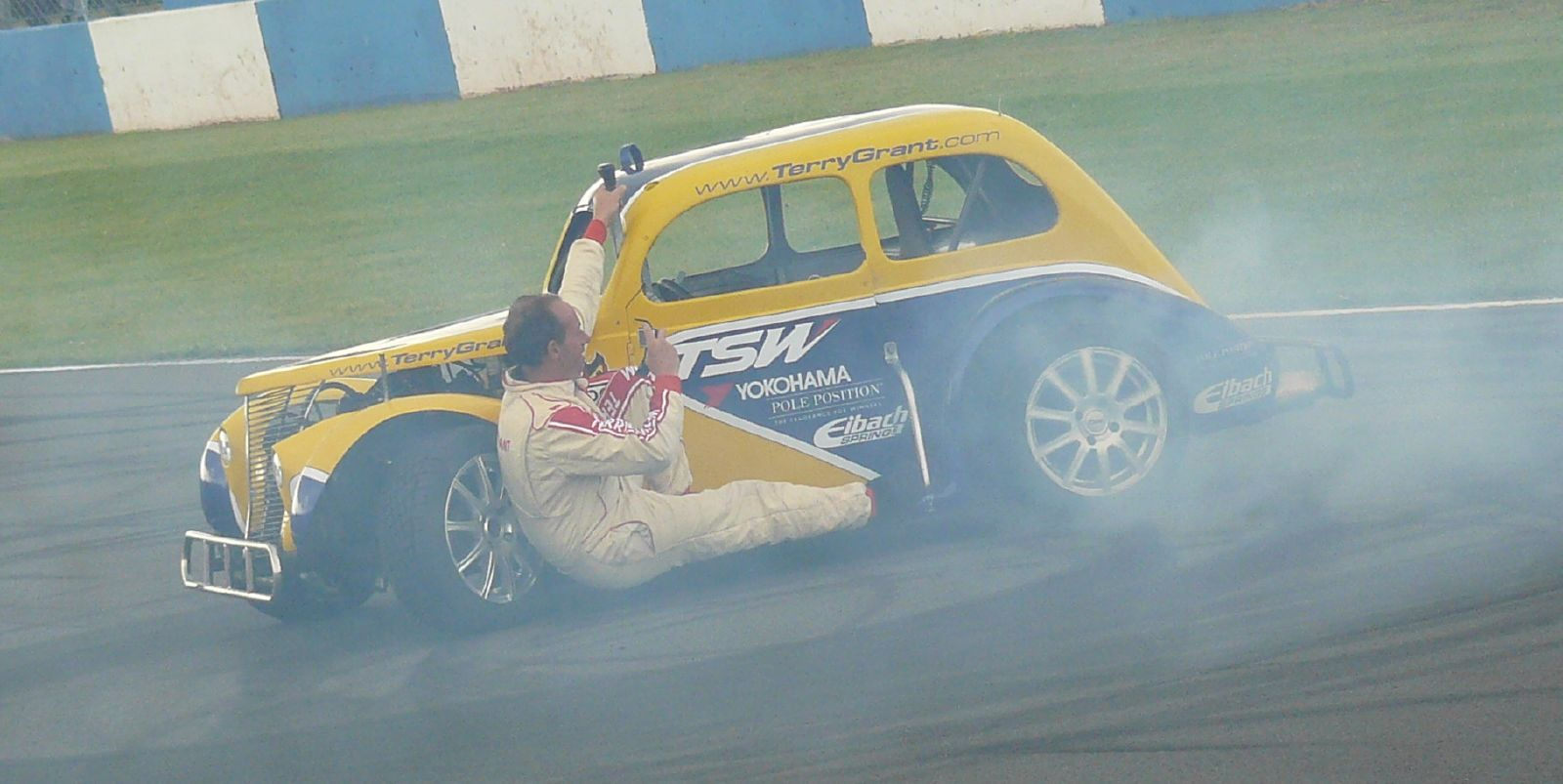
Stunt driver Terry Grant ghost-riding a spinning car

Ghost riding, frequently used in the context of "ghost riding the whip" (a "whip" being a vehicle) or simply ghostin', is when a person exits their moving vehicle, and dances beside and around it.

American rapper E-40's 2006 song "Tell Me When to Go" produced by Lil Jon brought mainstream attention to "ghost riding". Ghost riding is also another term used for car surfing, and the term is also occasionally used to describe a moving vehicle with no occupant, such as when a car without the hand brake applied starts to roll down an incline. The practice originated in Northern California, specifically the Bay Area. It gets its name from the fact that while the driver is dancing beside the moving vehicle, it appears that the vehicle is being driven by an invisible driver. Subsequently, the trend was also featured in the lyrics of the 2006 track "Ghost Ride It" by Mistah F.A.B. whose wording speaks of "Dancing on the hood while the car's still rollin'".

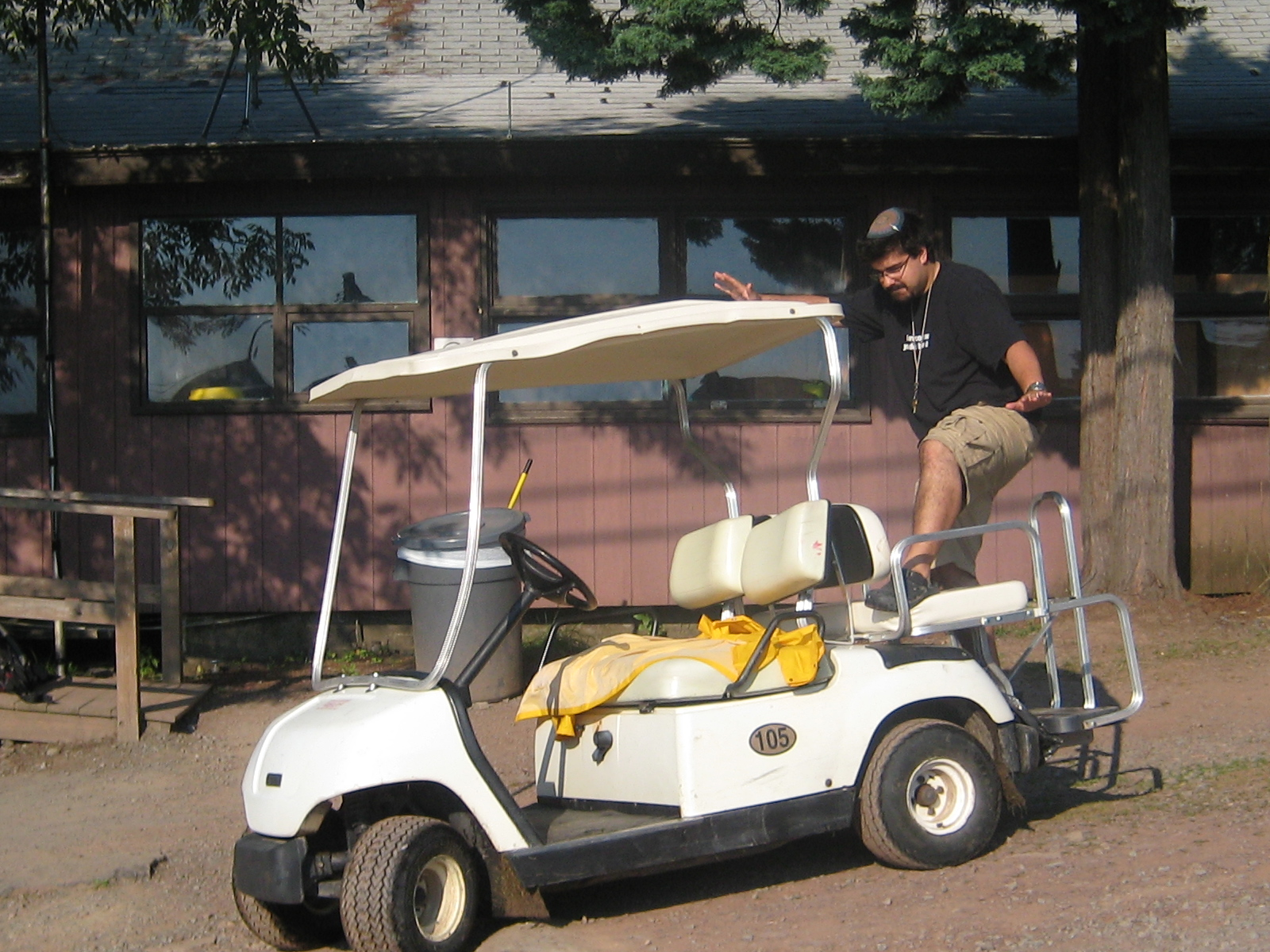
A man attempting to ghost ride the back of a golf cart going downhill.

Ghost riding is an activity that has been practiced in the San Francisco Bay Area including Oakland, California, for many years, during what are called sideshows. It is thought to have started as a trend around 2006. The popularization of ghost riding a car is a byproduct of popular Bay Area music and the hyphy subculture in general; additionally, it has been suggested ghost riding is a copycat crime popularized by YouTube videos and online social media.

Ghost riding is performed by exiting an automobile while it is left in gear. The automobile's engine runs at idle speed, slowly propelling the car forward. As with car surfing, ghost riding is dangerous and has resulted in deaths in North America.
