= Car surfing =

Act of riding on a moving vehicle

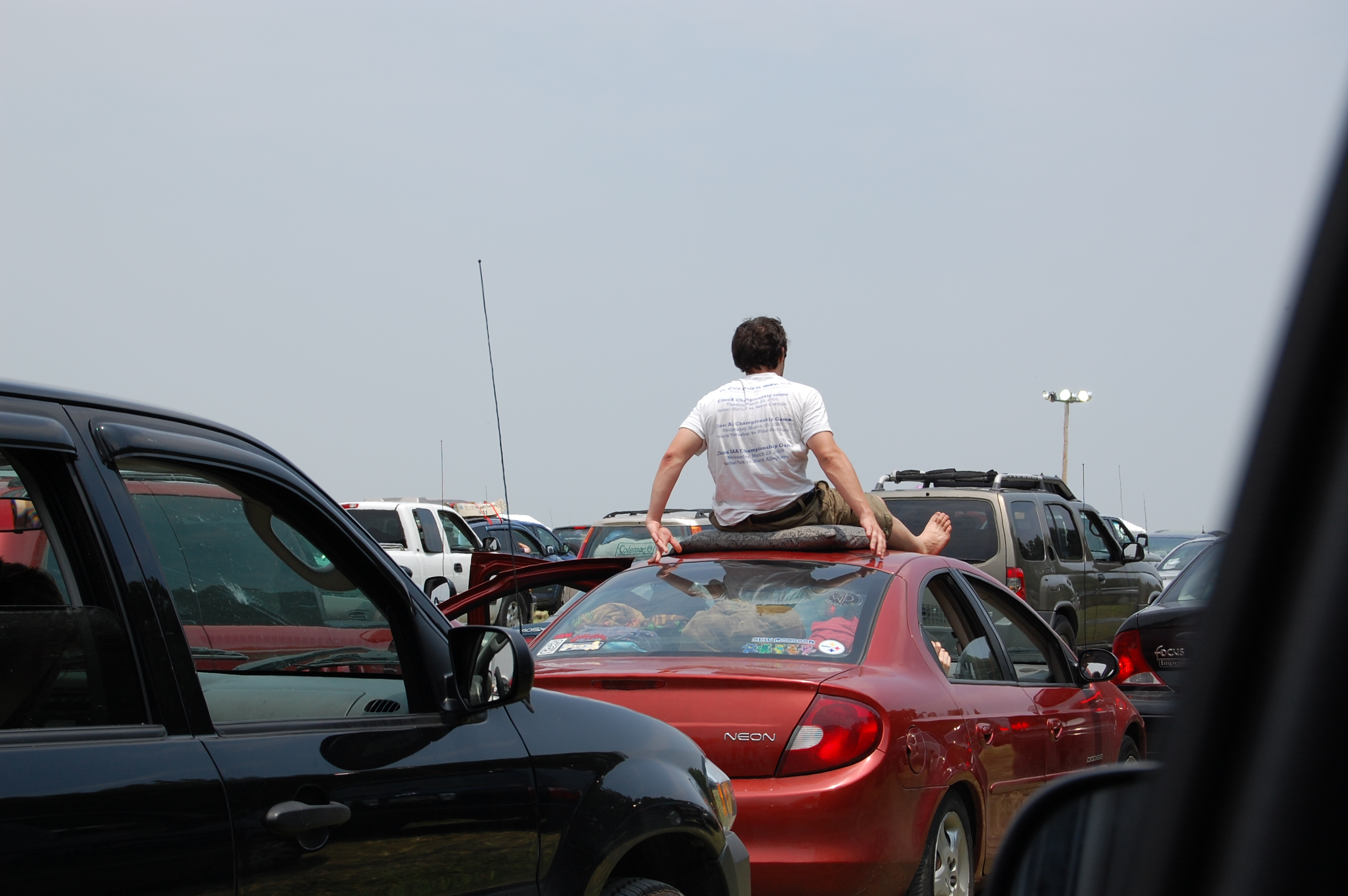
Man riding on the roof of a car

Car surfing involves riding on the outside of a moving vehicle being driven by another person. It has resulted in numerous deaths, predominantly causing severe head injuries.

The Quebec Automobile Insurance Company defines car surfing as follows:

- Riding on a moving vehicle (on the roof, at the rear, on the side, etc.);
- Riding in the box or cargo space of a truck or pick-up truck;
- Holding onto or being pulled by a moving vehicle;
- Riding in a sofa, on a skateboard, a sled or any other object hitched or tied to a moving vehicle.

== History ==
Car surfing, a term introduced in the mid-1980s, involves riding on the outside of a moving vehicle being driven by another person. It has been popularized by the hyphy movement seen in the fad of ghost-riding, except the vehicle remains under the nominal control of another person.

== Risks ==
A 2008 study by the United States Centers for Disease Control identified 58 newspaper reports of car-surfing deaths and 41 reports of nonfatal injury from 1990 through summer 2008. Most reports of injury were found in U.S. Midwest and Southern newspapers (75%), largely involving males (70%) and youths aged 15–19 (69%). A majority (58%) of reported car surfing incidents ended in death.

== See also ==
- Elevator surfing
- Ghost riding
- List of train-surfing injuries and deaths
- Skitching
- Tank desant
- Train surfing
