= Nightwork: A History of Hacks and Pranks at MIT =

Book covering various hacks from MIT

- First edition cover
- Language: English
- Subject: MIT hacks
- Genre: Non-fiction
- Publication date: 2003
- Publication place: United States
- ISBN: 978-0-262-66137-9

Nightwork: A History of Hacks and Pranks at MIT (first edition, 2003; ISBN 9780262661379); (revised edition, 2011; ISBN 978-0-262-51584-9) is a book which presents a historical catalog of some of the best-known MIT hacks (technically sophisticated practical jokes) as well as a series of essays reflecting on the cultural significance of hacks. MIT is one of the most selective universities in the United States, with a long-standing hacker tradition.

Nightwork combines The Journal of the Institute for Hacks, TomFoolery, and Pranks at MIT (J. IHTFP) with Is This The Way To Baker House? and new elements. The "author" of Nightwork is listed as "Institute Historian T. F. Peterson", which is a reference to the MIT cultural acronym IHTFP.

== See also ==
- Campus of the Massachusetts Institute of Technology
- Hacker (term)
- Hacks at the Massachusetts Institute of Technology
- Roof and tunnel hacking
