= Skitching =

Using a car to assist in human-powered transport (e.g. skateboarding)

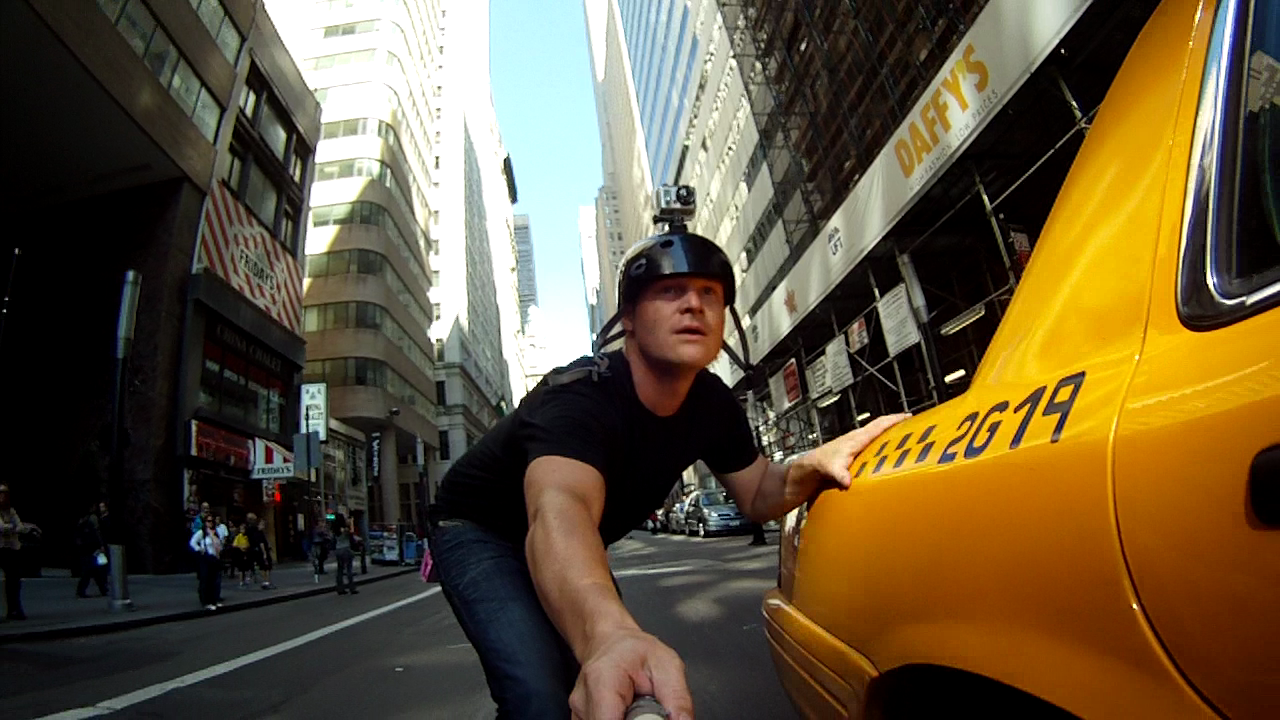
Skitching after a taxicab in New York City

Skitching (abbreviated from "skate-hitching", pron: /ˈskɪtʃɪŋ/) is the act of hitching a ride by holding onto a motor vehicle while riding on a skateboard, roller skates, bicycle, or sneakers when there is snowfall. It is also sometimes referred to as bum-riding or hooky bobbing when being towed over snowy or icy streets on boots or a sled. In addition, skitching can be performed on a bicycle or inner tube.

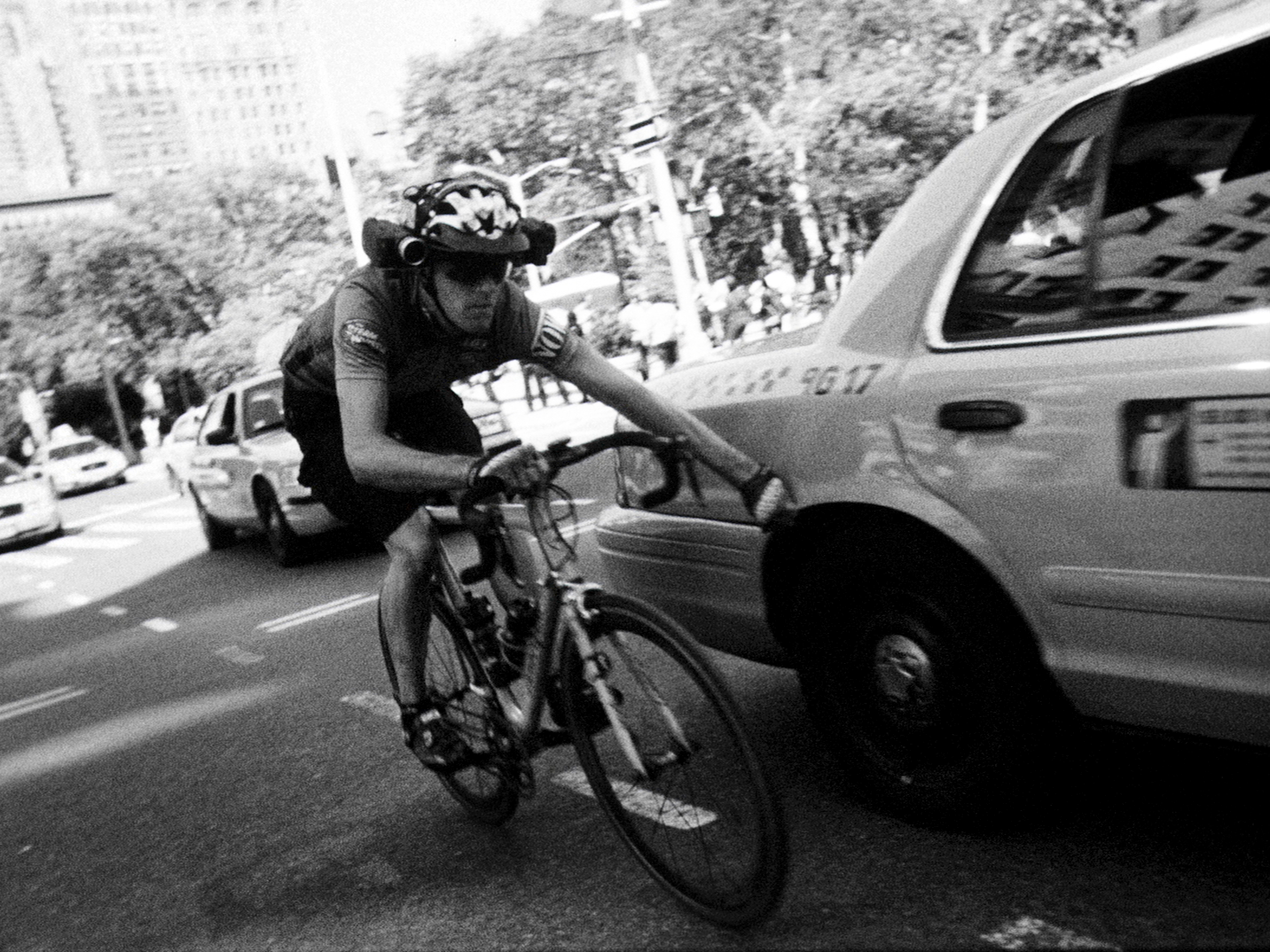
Lucas Brunelle demonstrating bicycle skitching

== Dangers ==
Because skitching is often done in traffic, on inadequate equipment for the speeds traveled, and sometimes without the knowledge of the driver of the vehicle, there is significant potential for injury or death. The skateboarding advocacy group Skaters for Public Skateparks reported that 2 of 42 skateboarding deaths in 2011 in the United States involved skitching.

Skateboarding celebrity Tony Hawk has advocated against the practice of skitching due to the related deaths and injuries.

== Cultural references ==
=== In film and television ===
Michael J. Fox can be seen skitching in Back to the Future (1985), as can Michael Beck in Xanadu (1980) and Christian Slater in Gleaming the Cube (1989) and Nerve (2016) as a dangerous stunt. It was portrayed in Biker Boyz (2003), Lords of Dogtown (2005), Premium Rush (2012), and Better Call Saul (season 1, 2015).

=== In literature ===
- In Neal Stephenson's 1992 novel Snow Crash, a skateboarder uses a magnetic harpoon to skitch.

=== In video games ===
- The 1994 Sega Mega Drive/Genesis video game Skitchin' involves racing against other skitchers.
- The 2002 video game Tony Hawk's Pro Skater 4 and subsequent games feature skitching.
- Skitching is featured in the game Jet Grind Radio.
- Bully features skitching after receiving the skateboard.
- Skitching is possible in Skate 2 and Skate 3.
- Skitching is included in Aggressive Inline.

== See also ==
- Car surfing
- Inner tube
- List of train-surfing injuries and deaths
- Train surfing
- Skijoring
