= List of tallest buildings in Cambridge, Massachusetts =

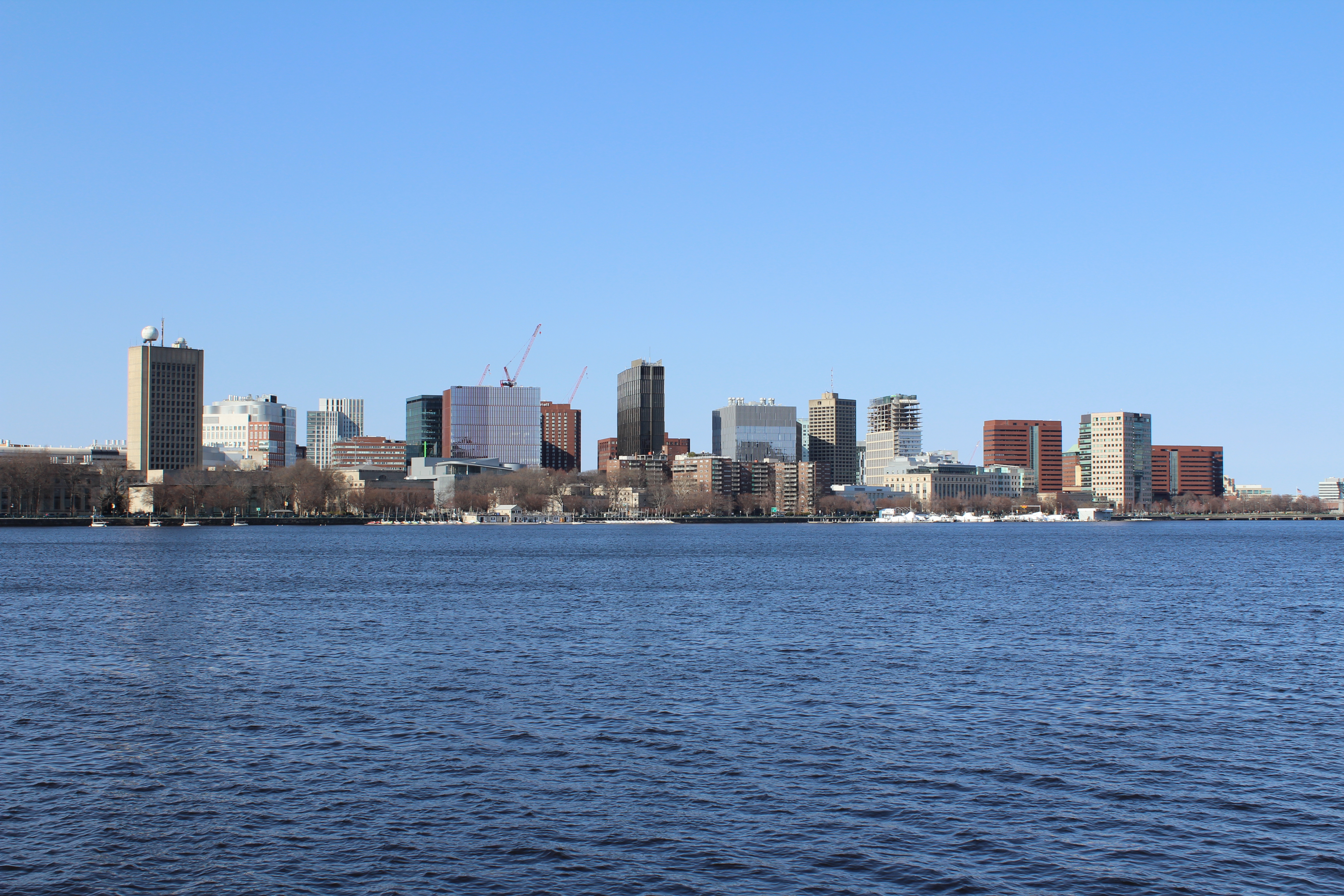
The Cambridge skyline in April 2021.

Cambridge is a city in Middlesex County in eastern Massachusetts, United States. Located on the northern shore of the Charles River, it is also a major suburb of Boston, the state capitol and regional financial center. It has a population of 118,403 (2020) and a growing number of high-rise buildings.

== Tallest buildings ==
This list ranks Cambridge buildings that stand at least 200 feet (61 m) tall, based on height measurement criteria established by the Council on Tall Buildings and Urban Habitat (CTBUH) and Emporis.com. This includes spires and architectural details but does not include antenna masts, roof top signs, flag poles or other functional-technical equipment. An equals sign (=) following a rank indicates the same height between two or more buildings. The "Year" column indicates the year in which a building was completed. Freestanding towers, guyed masts and other not habitable structures are included for comparison purposes; however, they are not ranked.

Rank	Name	Image	Height ft (m)	Floors	Year	Architect	Address	Notes	Ref.
1	121 Broadway		450 ft (137 m)	37	2026	Stantec	121 Broadway	Tallest building in Massachusetts outside Boston since 2026.	
2	AstraZeneca/Alexion Tower		320.5 ft (97.7 m)	18	2026	Pickard Chilton	290 Binney Street	MXD District	
3	Graduate Tower at Site 4		315 ft (96 m)	29	2020	Perkins&Will	45 Hayward Street	Tallest building in Cambridge since April 2, 2019.	
4	Akamai Technologies Global Headquarters		297 ft (91 m)	20	2019	Pickard Chilton	145 Broadway		
5	Boston Marriott Cambridge		290 ft (88 m)	26	1988	Moshe Safdie & Associates	2 Cambridge Center, Area 2/MIT	Tallest building built in the 1980s.	
6	Google Cambridge		288.5 ft (87.9 m)	16	2023	Pickard Chilton Architects with Stantec	325 Main Street	Part of MXD II.	
—	WJIB radio tower		285 ft (87 m)	N/A	1948		Neighborhood Nine	Mast radiator for WJIB and supports its FM translator, W267CE.	
7	Proto Kendall Square (Ames Street Residences)		284 ft (87 m)	22	2018	FXCollaborative	88 Ames Street		
8	MIT Kendall Square Site 5 (Building E28)		280 ft (85 m)	18	2021	Perkins&Will	314 Main Street		
9=	Avalon North Point		277 ft (84 m)	22	2008	CBT Architects	1 Leighton Street, Cambridge Crossing	Residential	
9=	Cecil and Ida Green Center for Earth Sciences (Green Building)		277 ft (84 m)	21	1964	I.M. Pei & Partners	Area 2/MIT	Height to tip - 312 ft (95 m) with radar dome.	
11	ONE65 Main		275 ft (84 m)	25	2022	Elkus Manfredi Architects	165 Main Street East Cambridge	300 residential units plus retail "to serve families of all sizes"	
12	Riverfront Office Park		270 ft (82 m)	18	1983; renovated 2012		101 Main St., East Cambridge	The taller of two interconnected towers	
13=	Rindge Towers I		269 ft (82 m) (est.)	22	1970		North Cambridge	Residential	
13=	Rindge Towers II		269 ft (82 m) (est.)	22	1970		North Cambridge	Residential	
13=	Rindge Towers III		269 ft (82 m) (est.)	22	1970		North Cambridge	Residential	
16	Stanley Building (The Broad Institute)		264 ft (80 m)	15	2014	Elkus Manfredi Architects	75 Ames Street		
17	Watermark Kendall West		262 ft (80 m) (est.)	24	2006	David Nagahiro of CBT	350 Third Street, Area 2/MIT		
18	40 Thorndike		258 ft (79 m)	20	2024	Elkus Manfredi Architects	40 Thorndike Street, East Cambridge	Residential/Office. Renovation of former Edward J. Sullivan Courthouse	
19	Park 151		252 ft (77 m)	20	2022		151 N First Street, Cambridge Crossing	Height to tip - 270 ft (82 m)	
20	Cambridge Crossing Parcel E/F (250 Water Street)		250 ft (76 m)	21	2020		250 Water Street, Cambridge Crossing	Life science and technology building	
21	Tang Residence Hall		248 ft (76 m)	24	1972	The Stubbins Associates	550 Memorial Drive; Area 2/MIT		
22	1010 Memorial Drive		240 ft (73 m)	20	1965		West Cambridge		
23	Twenty20		237 ft (72 m)	20	2015	CBT Architects	20 Child Street, East Cambridge	Residential	
24	MIT Kendall Square SoMa Site 3 Building		235 ft (72 m)	14	2022	McNamara • Salvia	238 Main Street		
25=	Regatta Riverview Residences 1		234 ft (71 m)	24	1998	Eisenburg Haven Architects	10 Museum Way, East Cambridge	Also called Museum Towers.	
25=	Regatta Riverview Residences 2		234 ft (71 m)	24	1998	Eisenburg Haven Architects	12 Museum Way, East Cambridge	Also called Museum Towers.	
27	One Broadway		230 ft (70 m)	17	1970		East Cambridge		
28=	Peabody Terrace Apartments I		226.85 ft (69.14 m)	22	1964		Riverside		
28=	Peabody Terrace Apartments II		226.85 ft (69.14 m)	22	1964		Riverside		
28=	Peabody Terrace Apartments III		226.85 ft (69.14 m)	22	1964		Riverside		
31	808 Memorial Drive		224 ft (68 m)	20	1975		Cambridgeport		
32=	929 Mass Apartments		220.32 ft (67.15 m)	18	1976		Mid-Cambridge		
32=	Mather House		220.32 ft (67.15 m) (est.)	18	1970		10 Cowperthwaite Street, Riverside	Harvard student residences.	
34	Cambridge Crossing Parcel G		220 ft (67 m)	14	2022	Perkins&Will	350 Water Street, Cambridge Crossing	Residential, Retail, & Office	Photos
35	William James Hall		215 ft (66 m) (est.)	15	1963		Baldwin		
36	Riverfront Office Park		210 ft (64 m)	14	1987; renovated 2012		101 Main Street, East Cambridge	The shorter of two interconnected towers	
37	One Memorial Drive		208 ft (63 m) (est.)	17	1986		Area 2/MIT		
38	Market Central Apartments		207 ft (63 m)	19	2020		425 Massachusetts Ave, Central Square	Formerly known as Mass+Main.	
39	100		205 ft (62 m)	18	2005		100 Landsdowne Street, Cambridgeport		
40	Frank J. Manning Apartments		204 ft (62 m)	19	1976		237 Franklin Street, Cambridgeport		

== Tallest under construction ==
Name	Image	Height ft (m)	Floors	Year	Architect	Address	Notes	Ref.
MXD Residential Building South		400 ft (120 m)	37	2021		121 Broadway, East Cambridge	Under construction. Height does not include mechanical penthouse.	
Biogen Global Headquarters / 75 Broadway		316.5 ft (96.5 m)	16	2027	Elkus Manfredi Architects	East Cambridge		
585 Third St		292.5 ft (89.2 m)	16	2023	CBT Architects	East Cambridge	Public amenities include 400-seat theater and a 150-seat stage	
MIT SoMa Building 2	Construction site in August 2024	240 ft (73 m)	13 or 14	TBD	Elkus Manfredi Architects	200 Main Street, Area 2/MIT	Parking garage, commercial laboratory, office spaces, and retail.	

== Tallest demolished ==
Name	Image	Height ft (m)	Floors	Year	Architect	Address	Notes	Ref.
Eastgate Married Student Housing		277 ft (84 m)	30	1967	Eduardo Catalano	30 Wadsworth Street	Closed 2020; demolished 2022	

== See also ==
- List of tallest buildings in Boston
- List of tallest buildings in Springfield, Massachusetts
- List of tallest buildings in Worcester, Massachusetts
- List of tallest buildings in Massachusetts, exclusive of Boston
