= 1144 Fifteenth =

Office skyscraper in Denver, Colorado

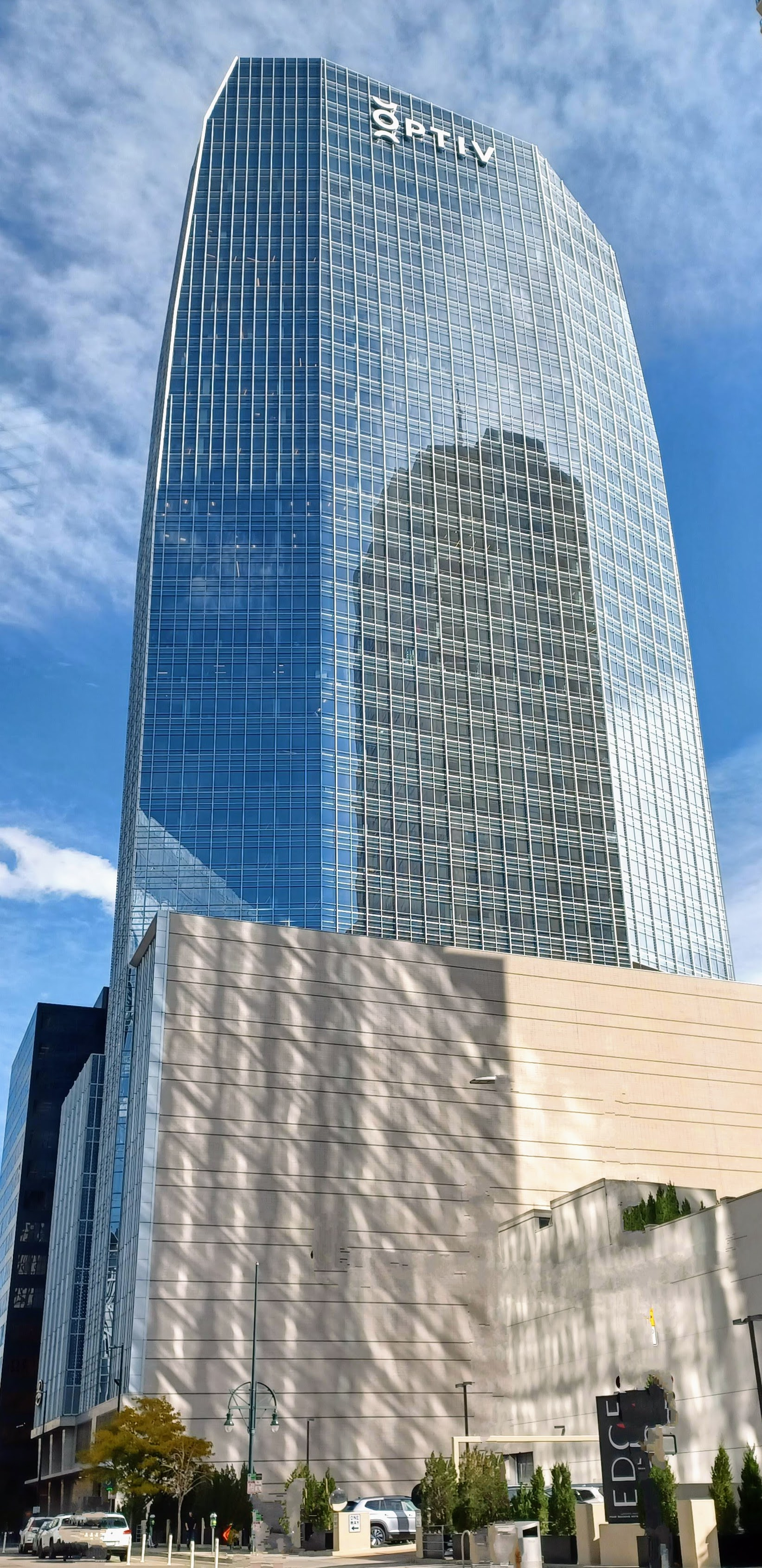

General information
- Status: Completed
- Type: Office
- Location: 1144 15th Street, Denver, Colorado, United States
- Coordinates: 39.7477°N 104.9956°W
- Completed: 2018
- Cost: $300 million
- Owner: Hines

Height
- Height: 603 feet (184 m)

Technical details
- Floor count: 40
- Floor area: 665,000 sq ft (61,800 m^{2})

Design and construction
- Architect: Pickard Chilton
- Main contractor: Hensel Phelps

Website
- 1144fifteenth.com

1144 Fifteenth is a high-rise building in downtown Denver, Colorado. Completed in 2018, the 40-story tower rises approximately 603 feet (184 m). The building occupies a full city block bounded by 15th Street, Lawrence Street, and Arapahoe Street, near Union Station in Denver’s central business district.

== Design and construction ==
1144 Fifteenth was developed by Hines, a global real estate development firm, and designed by the architectural firm Pickard Chilton. The building was constructed by Hensel Phelps.

Construction began in 2015 and was completed in 2018. The building contains approximately 665,000 square feet of Class AA office space, with ground-level retail and structured parking. The structure features large, column-free floors and a glass curtain-wall façade designed to maximize daylight and views of downtown Denver and the Front Range. Amenities include conference facilities, tenant lounges, bicycle storage, and fitness-oriented features. The building also incorporates outdoor terrace spaces on select levels.

=== Sustainability ===
1144 Fifteenth achieved LEED Gold certification under the U.S. Green Building Council’s BD+C rating system. Sustainability measures include high-performance glazing, efficient mechanical systems, water-conserving fixtures, and strategies to improve indoor environmental quality.

== Awards ==
- ENR Mountain States 2018 Project of the Year, Office/Retail/Mixed-Use Development

== See also ==
- List of tallest buildings in Denver
