= Cambridge North =

Cambridge North may refer to:

- Cambridge North, a neighbourhood in Cambridge, New Zealand
- Cambridge North railway station, a railway station in Cambridge, England

== See also ==
- North Cambridge, Massachusetts
