= Qualtrics Tower =

High-rise office building in Seattle, Washington, U.S.

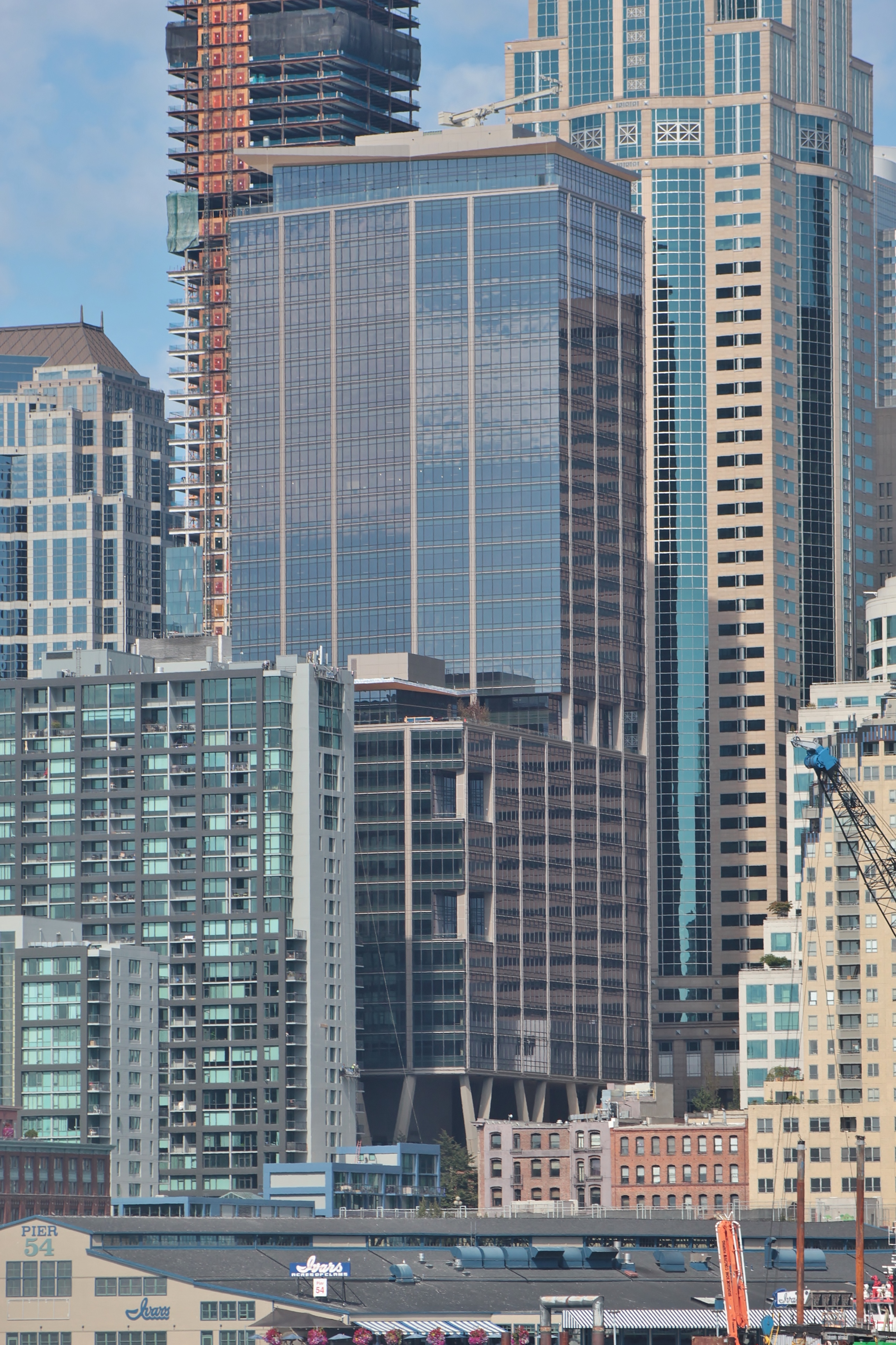
- Under construction in August 2019

- Location within downtown Seattle
- Former names: 2+U (2&U)

General information
- Status: Completed
- Type: Office
- Location: 1201 2nd Avenue; Seattle, Washington
- Coordinates: 47°36′24.1″N 122°20′14.4″W
- Construction started: January 2017
- Topped-out: November 2018
- Completed: 2020
- Cost: $392 million

Height
- Height: 500 feet (150 m)

Technical details
- Floor count: 37
- Floor area: 725,000 square feet (67,400 m^{2})

Design and construction
- Architecture firm: Pickard Chilton
- Developer: Skanska
- Structural engineer: Magnusson Klemencic Associates
- Main contractor: Skanska

Other information
- Parking: 476 spaces

Website
- 2andu.com

Qualtrics Tower, formerly known as 2+U and 2&U, is a high-rise office building in Downtown Seattle, Washington. The 500-foot-tall (150 m), 38-story tower is located at 2nd Avenue and University Street and was completed in 2020. The building has 725,000 square feet (67,400 m^{2}) of leasable space, including retail and public spaces on the lower levels. The largest office tenant is Qualtrics, who also hold the naming rights to the building.

== History ==
The project was originally announced as "2+U" in November 2014, after the signing of a lease agreement with Samis Foundation for their property at 2nd Avenue and University Street in Downtown Seattle. Developer Skanska selected Connecticut-based architecture firm Pickard Chilton to design the tower after a three-week "hack-a-thon" in which they competed with another firm, as opposed to a traditional request for proposals. The leasing center for the project used Microsoft's HoloLens mixed reality technology to create a virtual tour for potential tenants.

The Seattle Department of Construction and Inspections approved the design of the tower in December 2016. An appeal from the owners of the 1201 Third Avenue tower against Skanska to prevent an alley vacation was dropped in January 2017, allowing for construction on the project to begin. Work on the $392 million tower began the following month with the demolition of the Galland, Seneca and Friedman buildings, as well as a vacant playground. The Diller Building, on the northwest corner of the block, was not included in the development and will remain under different ownership. Excavation of the tower's underground parking garage began in April 2017 and was completed in August, reaching a depth of 80 feet (24 m) under 2nd Avenue. The first major column, an 85-foot (26 m) W-shaped steel piece, was installed in April 2018. The tower was topped out in November 2018.

The building was renamed to the Qualtrics Tower in September 2019, after Qualtrics signed a 275,000-square-foot (25,500 m^{2}) office lease that will take up 13 stories. Three workers were injured by an electrical incident on the ninth floor of the building while it was under construction in December 2019.

In November 2020, Skanska sold its stake in the building for $688 million to Hana Alternative Asset Management (part of the Hana Financial Group). As of January 2021, Qualtrics has not announced an opening date for their co-headquarters in the building due to the COVID-19 pandemic.

== Design ==
The design of 2+U, conceived by Connecticut-based architecture firm Pickard Chilton, has been described as "dramatic" and "different" for elements at ground level. The tower will be supported by stilt-like "V" columns that rise 65 to 85 feet (20 to 26 m) above street level. The podium facing 1st Avenue will be 19 stories tall and include a landscaped rooftop deck. The main tower, rising 38 stories above street level, will have its own rooftop terrace and other amenities.

In September 2016, the Seattle City Council approved an alley vacation for the project, exchanging the loss of a through-alley for promised public amenities. At the base of the tower will be a privately owned public space featuring an urban plaza with two stories of retail and restaurant space, public passageways and viewing platforms, public staircases with elevators to assist in hillclimbing, seating areas, and space for concerts and food trucks.

== Tenants ==
In 2018, employment search engine Indeed announced that it would occupy 10 floors of the tower, leasing a total of 200,000 square feet (19,000 m^{2}) of space. Spaces, a coworking subsidiary of IWG, planned to occupy three floors. Video game developer Bungie occupies two floors that were originally leased by cloud storage service Dropbox, who opted to sublet and adopt remote working. The building was fully leased out in September 2019 with the signing of an agreement with experience management firm Qualtrics to lease 13 stories to accommodate 2,000 workers at its co-headquarters.

The restaurant space was originally slated to be occupied by Tavolàta, an Italian restaurant operated by local chef Ethan Stowell. Tavolàta was replaced by a "tavern" eatery and bar that opened in July 2022. Other tenants in the ground level spaces include Caffe Ladro, a barber shop, and a furniture retailer.

== See also ==
- List of tallest buildings in Seattle
