= The Diller Hotel =

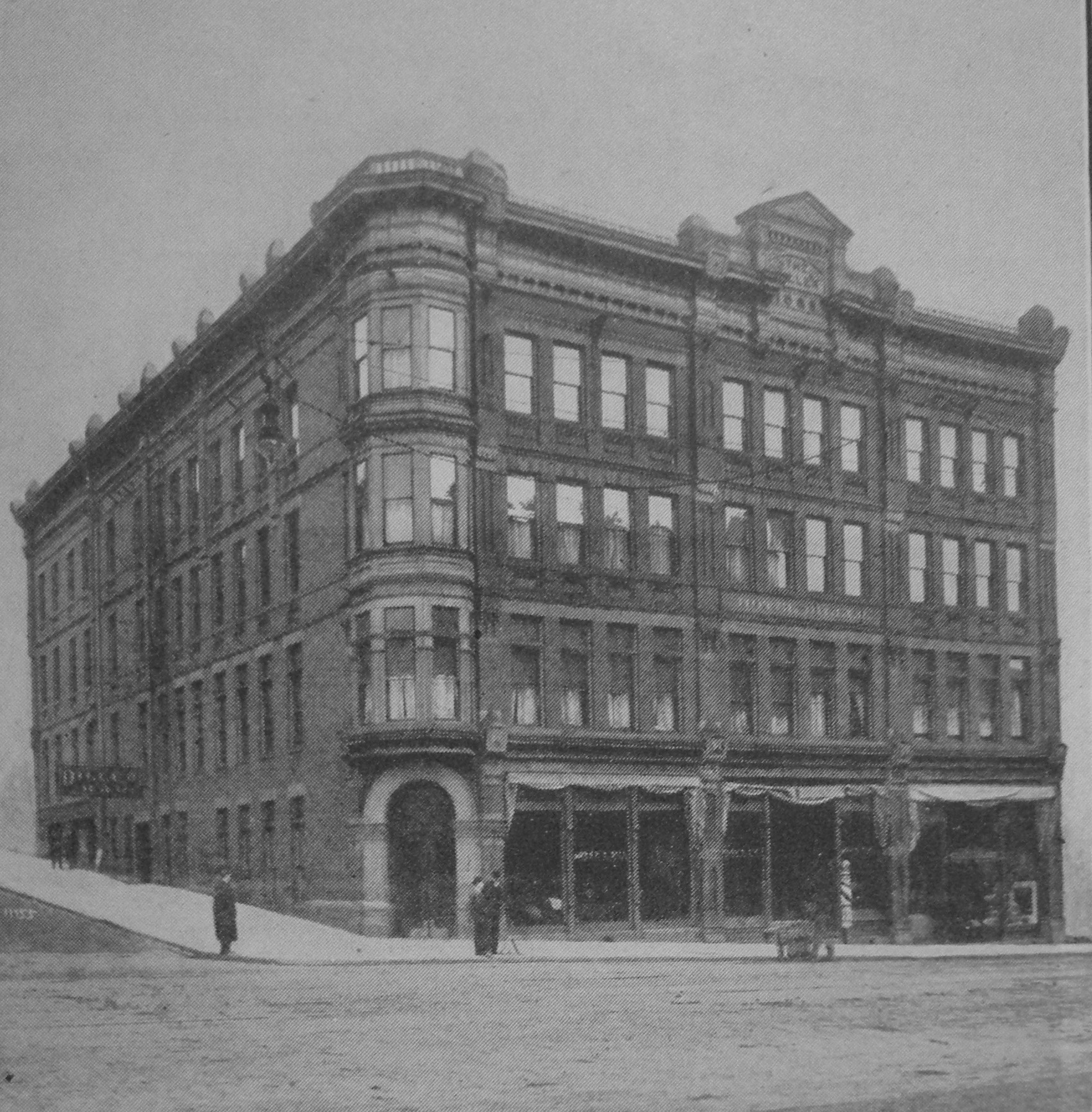
- The Diller Hotel, 1909

- Location within Downtown Seattle
- Alternative names: The Diller Room

General information
- Location: 1216 1st Avenue; Seattle, Washington
- Coordinates: 47°36′25″N 122°20′16″W
- Construction started: 1889
- Opened: June 6, 1890

Design and construction
- Architect: Louis L. Mendel

The Diller Hotel is a former hotel building in downtown Seattle, Washington. In the early 1900s, it was known as one of Seattle's few luxury hotels. This historic building is located at the corner of First Avenue and University Street, across from the Seattle Art Museum, and is one of the few remaining buildings left from the 1890s, a period of reconstruction and commercial development after the area was destroyed by the fire of 1889. The hotel was owned by Leonard Diller (1839–1901) and family and was designed by architect Louis L. Mendel. The building is now home to The Diller Room, a craft cocktail bar housed in the former hotel lobby.

== History ==
In January 1887 pioneer Seattle merchant Leonard Diller, who previously traded as a butcher operating the City Market, entered the hotel trade when he leased the old Brunswick Hotel in Pioneer Square from Watson C. Squire. His plans for a new hotel at Front and University Streets, then a largely residential area on the opposite end of downtown, were first announced in February 1889. Though largely resembling what would eventually be built, the earliest plans called for the building to have a complete iron front, which would have been a first for Seattle had it been realized.

The Great Seattle Fire began on June 6, 1889, originating from an old carpenter shop on the corner of Front and Madison Street, known as the Pontius Block. Connected to the Pontius Block was the Denny Block made up of primarily wooden buildings which caught fire soon after it had begun. Historic hotels were destroyed in the fire such as the Arlington, the Pacific House and Diller's own Brunswick Hotel (all being large wood-framed buildings). The fire ended destroying a total of 36 blocks and four of the waterfront wharves coming to a total of 116 acres of destroyed land at an estimated cost of $20,000,000. Diller's new hotel however was well north of the burnt district and construction resumed at a normal pace.

After the devastation of the Seattle fire the city required buildings to be made primarily of masonry in order to achieve a "fire-resistant" city, causing a shortage of domestic building materials. This called for massive amounts of brick to be imported from Japan. The Diller Hotel was one of the first of the new brick buildings completed, opening exactly one year after the fire on June 6, 1890. The main goal of the area was to promote residential living and developing suburban neighborhoods by providing public transportation of railways and cable cars. By 1900, more than 29 road railways and cable cars were in full operation. Residential areas did not develop in the area but hotels were being built due to immigrants, tourists, and entrepreneurs; within four years of the fire 63 hotels had opened.

The Diller Hotel opened to the public exactly one year after the fire on June 6, 1890. The new hotel was thought as one of the luxury hotels with amenities such as the running water, toilets, and the first elevator. The Diller Hotel struggled immensely in the first years of opening until 1897 when gold was found in Alaska and Seattle had become known as the "Gateway to Alaska" for miners and workers to and from Alaska. The Klondike Gold Rush not only was responsible for the major growth the Seattle as a city but also helped many businesses including the Diller Hotel. In 1905 The Diller, now owned by Diller's widow, was extended 30 feet to the alley under the supervision of architect James Donnellan. The new addition, which added 40 rooms to the hotel (for 150 rooms total), was designed to conform with the existing architecture.

In 1916, Washington State declared a prohibition policy which resulted in the ban of the sale of alcohol statewide; this was three years earlier than the United States passed the Eighteenth Amendment and entered the Prohibition Era which lasted from 1919 to 1933. As a result, to the new law, speakeasies, which were illegal bars, popped up very quickly all around the country. The Diller Bar became a speakeasy having the front of a Chinese laundromat as a disguise for the illegal bar inside.

The population of the Seattle had allowed for numerous hotels to be built along First Avenue and continuing to Second Avenue, including new skyscraper hotels. These new hotels housed the "first class" citizens as First Avenue fell into disarray and soon become known as "Flesh Avenue" around the end of the Second World War. It was a garish street full of neon signs, bars, porn shops, and pawn shops.

Now the hotel is simply known as "The Diller". It has been turned into apartments used by many students and artists today though it is still legally considered a hotel. It has become known for The Diller Room, a nostalgic-style cocktail bar was created by Robert B. and Josie S. Wilson in 2009. It occupies part of the former lobby and what was once The Diller Bar and The Flamingo Room post WW2 through the 1970s. The area has improved and is fast becoming one of the best parts of the city being home to major attractions such as the Pike Place Market and the Seattle Art Museum as well as top hotels such as the new Four Seasons, Hotel 1000 and the Harbor Steps on First Avenue.

In 2017, the block surrounding the Diller Building was demolished for the development of 2&U, a 38-story high-rise office building.

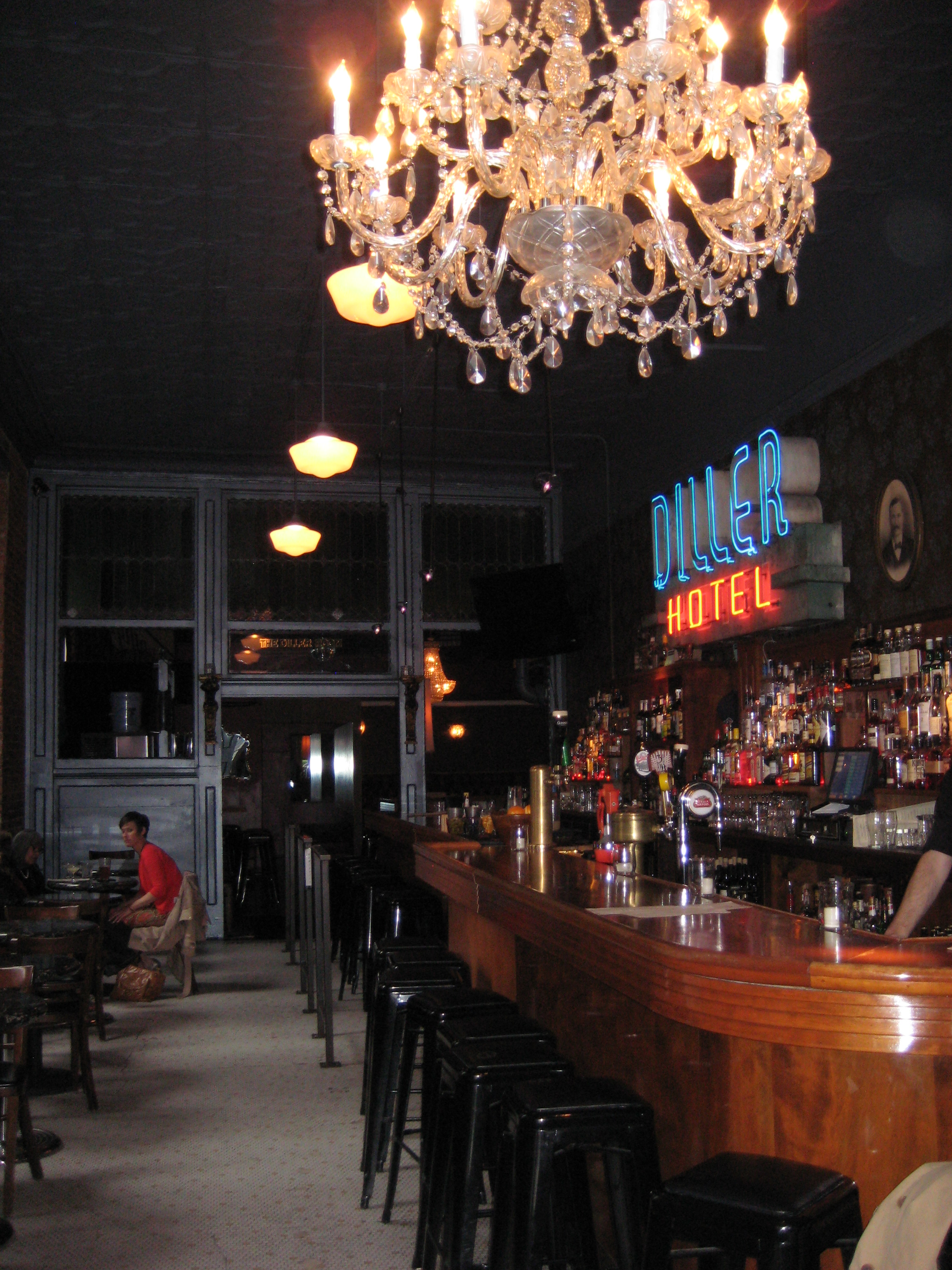
The Diller Room, 2012

== Notable people ==
=== Leonard Diller ===
Leonard Diller (1839–1901) was born in Ohio and moved to Oregon City, Oregon to start a successful mercantile business in 1864. Diller then moved north to Tacoma, Washington, in 1873 then onto Seattle in 1876. He immediately became the owner of the Sneider Market, the Desmond Hotel, and in 1885 the Brunswick Hotel. The Brunswick Hotel, located on South Main and First Street, was destroyed in the 1889 fire so Diller built this new hotel after the fire.

=== Louis L. Mendel ===
Louis Mendel (1867–1940) is primarily known for his work with his partner of thirteen years Charles H. Bebb. He was first employed with an architecture firm in Cleveland, Ohio, before moving to San Diego in 1886 and then onto Seattle in 1889. He returned to California in 1893 due to the economic panic that occurred after the Seattle fire though returned in 1889 to begin his work with Charles Bebb. Some buildings designed by the partners include: University Heights School (1902), the Seattle Athletic Club (1903–04, destroyed), and the Frye Hotel 1906–11).
