= Qualtrics =

Experience management company

Qualtrics, LLC
- Type: Private
- Industry: Experience Management
- Founded: 2002; 24 years ago
- Founders: Scott M. Smith; Ryan Smith; Jared Smith; Stuart Orgill
- Headquarters: Provo, Utah and; Seattle, Washington, U.S
- Key people: Ryan Smith (Executive Chairman); Jason Maynard (CEO)
- Products: Qualtrics XM Platform, Customer Experience suite, Employee Experience suite, Market Research suite
- Owner: Silver Lake
- Number of employees: 6,306 (March 2026)
- Website: qualtrics.com

Qualtrics, LLC is an American experience management company, with co-headquarters in Seattle, Washington, and Provo, Utah. The company was founded in 2002 by Scott M. Smith, Ryan Smith, Jared Smith, and Stuart Orgill.

Qualtrics offers a cloud-based subscription software platform for what they call Experience Management, which it launched in March 2017 and helps companies collect and analyze feedback from employees, customers and others. Qualtrics software is used widely in academia to conduct survey research; however, in 2012 the company began to pivot toward serving enterprise customers. As of 2026, the company is focused on data collection and the use of agentic AI.

== History ==
Qualtrics was founded in Provo, Utah in 2002. The company began in the Smiths' basement and operated from there for five years. Stuart Orgill, a friend of Ryan Smith, later joined them as the company began to grow.

In the company's first decade of operation, more than 1,300 universities used its Qualtrics Research Suite. Its customers also included Boeing, FedEx, and Microsoft.

=== 2010–2019 ===
In 2012, the company received a $70 million Series A investment from Sequoia Capital and Accel. It was the largest joint investment to date by these two firms. In September 2014, the two firms returned to Series B funding, led by Insight Partners. The funding, worth $150 million, was a record for a Utah-based company, and it valued the company at $1 billion.

In May 2016, Qualtrics acquired statistical analysis startup Statwing for an undisclosed sum. Statwing was a San Francisco-based company that created point-and-click software for advanced statistical analysis.

In April 2018, the firm acquired Delighted for an undisclosed sum. Delighted had more than 1,500 customers at the time of acquisition.

On October 19, 2018, Qualtrics filed its S-1 registration statement through an initial public offering (IPO). At the time, the company listed over 9,000 global customers.

Plans for the IPO were scrapped when it was announced in November 2018 that Qualtrics would be acquired by SAP (NYSE: SAP).

SAP bought Qualtrics in January 2019 for US$8 billion in an all-cash deal.

=== 2020–present ===
On July 26, 2020, SAP announced its intent to take Qualtrics public through an IPO in the United States. According to SAP, the decision to go public was made due to Qualtrics' performance since the acquisition, with 2019 cloud growth in excess of 40 percent. SAP's stated intent was to remain the majority owner of Qualtrics, while Qualtrics co-founder Ryan Smith remained the company's largest shareholder.

On January 28, 2021, Qualtrics began trading on the Nasdaq at $41.85 per share.

In January 2021, Brad Anderson, a high level executive of Microsoft, joined Qualtrics as president of products and services.

In October 2021, the firm acquired Clarabridge in an all-stock deal for $1.125 billion. Clarabridge was a Virginia-based company that created software for omnichannel conversational analytics.

In May 2022, Qualtrics announced it would go live on Amazon Web Services (AWS) cloud infrastructure in London in the second half of 2022. Qualtrics customers would be able to access the XM Platform locally via AWS London region. Furthermore, Qualtrics announced it would be opening a London office and customer experience centre.

In March 2023, a group of investors including private equity firm Silver Lake, CPP Investment Board, and co-founder Ryan Smith agreed to buy Qualtrics from SAP in an all-cash deal worth $12.5 billion.

Silver Lake first invested more than $500 million in Qualtrics during the company's IPO in 2021. In March 2023, Silver Lake agreed to take Qualtrics private. In June 2023, the Qualtrics acquisition by Silver Lake was completed. At the time of the close, the Qualtrics deal was the single largest investment in Silver Lake's history.

In connection with the close, Accel, a global venture capital firm, as well as BDT & MSD Partners, a merchant bank built to serve the distinct needs of business owners and strategic, long-term investors; and DFO Management, the family investment office of Michael Dell, joined Silver Lake in investing in Qualtrics. Accel, which was one of Qualtrics' earliest investors, invested $500 million. BDT & MSD Partners and DFO Management each made a co-investment of $250 million, for an aggregate commitment of $500 million.

In August 2025, Qualtrics and PureSpectrum entered into a partnership aimed at accelerating research teams' access to market insights related to synthetic research capabilities. Through the agreement, PureSpectrum designated Qualtrics as its exclusive synthetic panel provider.

In October 2025, Qualtrics announced the acquisition of Indiana-based healthcare-focused technology company Press Ganey for $6.75 billion, including debt, making it the company's largest acquisition to date. The acquisition, which was finalized in May 2026, expanded Qualtrics’ healthcare network to include 41,000 facilities using Press Ganey Forsta systems. Qualtrics' acquisition of Press Ganey Forsta was reportedly the largest technology acquisition in Utah history.

On February 3, 2026, Qualtrics named Jason Maynard its new CEO and appointed Maynard to its board of directors. Maynard, the former executive vice president of revenue operations at Oracle, replaced Jim Whitehurst and Mark Gillett, who became interim co-CEOs after Zig Serafin stepped down as CEO in October 2025.

In March 2026, the PGA Tour named Qualtrics the official tool of its new "Voice of the Gallery" program, part of the Tour's Fan Forward initiative.

At Qualtrics' X4 Experience Management Summit in March 2026, the company introduced new artificial intelligence capabilities, including synthetic consumer panels that allow organizations to simulate how consumers may respond to research questions. The panels were tested by Google, Navy Federal Credit Union, and Dollar Shave Club, among other companies.

== See also ==
- Qualtrics Tower
