= Peter Thomas Stanford =

African American religious minister and writer

The Reverend Peter Thomas Stanford
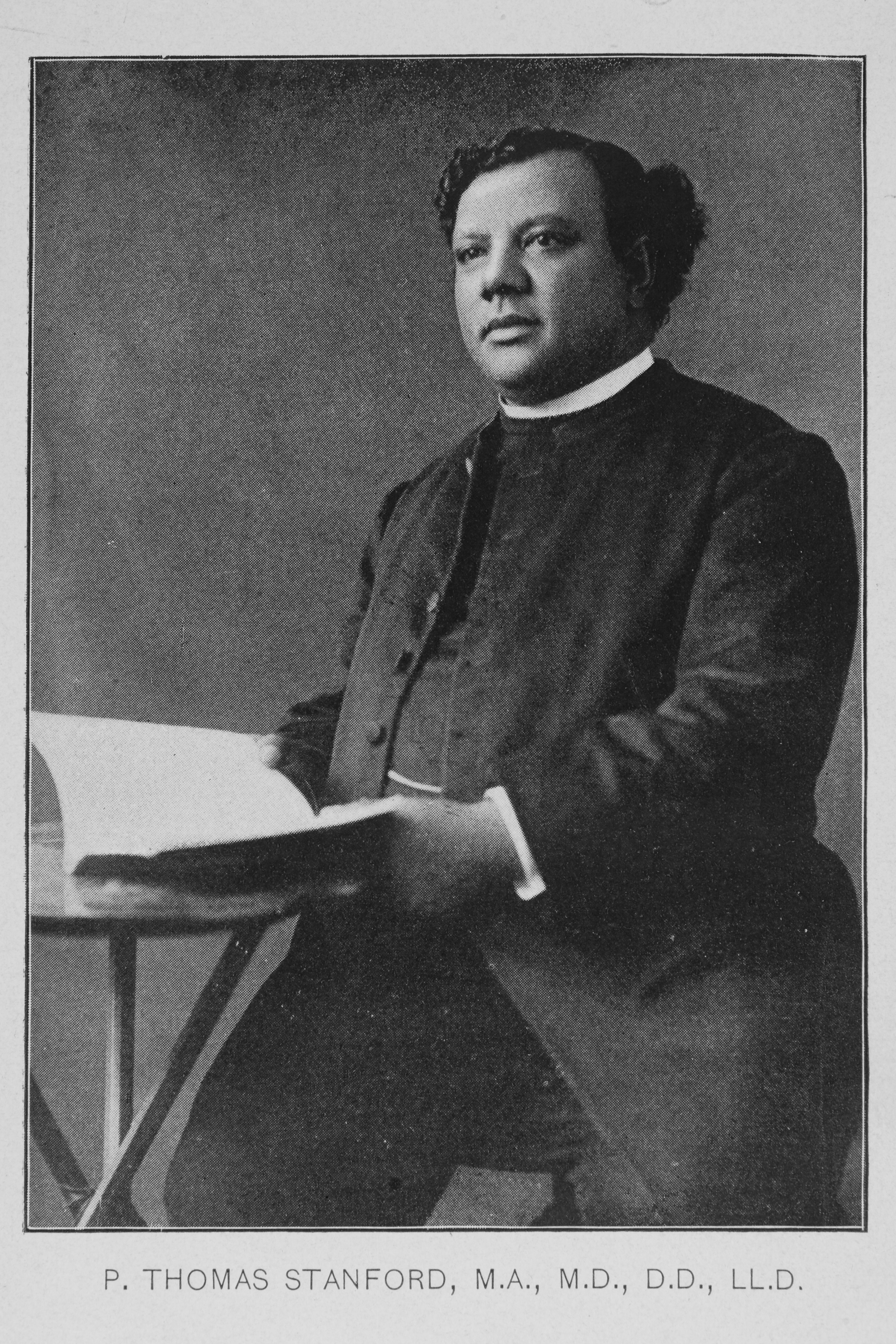
- Born: February 21, 1858; Hampton, VA
- Died: May 20, 1909 (aged 51); North Cambridge, MA

Peter Thomas Stanford (February 21, 1858 – May 20, 1909) was an African American religious minister and writer, born enslaved near Hampton, Virginia. His enslavers orphaned him after selling both of his parents to other plantations before he had turned five years of age. As an orphaned child, he likely lived briefly among the Pamunkey Native American Tribe before the Freedmen’s Bureau sent him to be adopted by a white family in Boston in 1866. His adoptive family abused him. As a stowaway in the coal box of a train in 1871 (possibly aged 13 or 14 years old), Stanford self-emancipated from this captivity and arrived to freedom in New York City. Over the course of his life, he became an influential post-bellum antislavery activist, writer, and philanthropist in America, Canada, and England.

After escaping the horrors of his childhood, Stanford spent three decades preaching against slavery and racial violence. He published opinion pieces, sermons, and essays prolifically in the post-bellum transatlantic press. Stanford is the author of two memoirs:The Plea of the Ex-Slaves Now in Canada (1885) and From Bondage to Liberty (1889) as well as three editions of the textbook titled The Tragedy of the Negro in America (1897, 1897, 1903). Influenced by other Black activists, particularly Ida B. Wells, Booker T. Washington, and Frederick Douglass, his writings are part of a legacy of African American antislavery literature between abolition and the Harlem Renaissance.

== Life ==
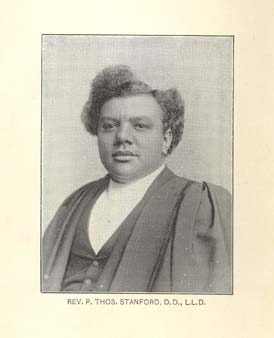

Stanford never knew his father, who was sold by slave traders before he was born. When he was a toddler, his enslavers made him an orphan by selling his mother Caroline. As a young child, Stanford shared that he lived for two years among a community of Indigenous people, likely the Pamunkey Native American tribe. Over time, Stanford’s stories about his time with Algonquian-speaking people grew. In The Plea (1885), Stanford includes untranslated Algonquian songs, perhaps as a way to express some degree of fluency in the language and connection to the community. He then increases his claim in his second memoir, From Bondage to Liberty (1889). At the time, curiosity and exoticization of people from Africa, Asia, and India was commonplace among White European and European-descended communities, a large proportion of Stanford’s audience.

Around 1866, the Freedmen’s Bureau sent the young Stanford to Boston as an orphan to be adopted by a White couple. Like the earlier antislavery writer Harriet Wilson, Stanford suffered abuse at their hands: he was overworked and underfed in a living situation not unlike enslavement. In 1871, he ran away from his adoptive family and arrived in New York. At this time, he joined a community of people who helped him to find work and to learn to read and write English, including the Brooklyn pastor Henry Highland Garnet and famous writer Harriet Beecher Stowe. In 1875, Stanford converted to Christianity. By 1880, Stanford became one of the first African Americans to graduate from Connecticut’s Suffolk Institute. Stanford then became a pastor of African American churches in Hartford, Connecticut. By 1881, Stanford had gone to Ontario, Canada at the request of the Amherstburg Baptist Association (ABA). In May 1883, Stanford traveled by steamer from Canada to Liverpool also by request of the ABA. Once in England, Stanford’s reputation grew and he became the first African American minister in Birmingham as the pastor of Hope Street Chapel (now Highgate Baptist Church). In 1895, Stanford returned to America where he would live permanently for the rest of his life, visiting England briefly only once more.

During their lifetimes, Stanford and his wife Beatrice Stickley were both active members of The Society for the Recognition of the Universal Brotherhood of Man (SRBM), the organization founded by Catherine Impey that published the antiracist journals Fraternity, Anti-Caste, and The Bonds of Brotherhood. In 1897, Stanford founded the St. Mark’s Congregational Church of Roxbury, the first African American church in Boston. He also founded the Interdenominational Ministers Association of Boston, and in North Cambridge, Massachusetts, he organized an orphanage and school for single women and girls known at one point as the Union Industrial and Strangers’ Home. With William Monroe Trotter, the civil rights activist and founder of Boston’s Guardian newspaper, Stanford ventured into political discussions. He served as vice-president of Baltimore’s Christ’s Medical and Chirurgical College and he was editor of its 1909 journal. Stanford also was the vice-president for the National Baptist Convention of Massachusetts.

== Personal life ==
Stanford married his wife Beatrice Mabel Stickley (c. 1868–1900) while living in England. They had a daughter together named Carolyn. After the death of Beatrice in 1900, Stanford married Myra Elizabeth Matthews, a music teacher in America. They had a contentious relationship and Stanford faced scrutiny after Myra subpoenaed him for failure to support her. As a result, he left Syracuse, New York, and in 1907 he moved to Auburn, New York, to work with Harriet Tubman on developing an orphanage. When his health began to fail, he returned to his base in North Cambridge, Massachusetts.

On May 20, 1909, Stanford died in North Cambridge from kidney failure.

== Works ==
- The Plea of the Ex-Slaves Now in Canada (1885)
- From Bondage to Liberty (1889)
- The Tragedy of the Negro in America (1897, 1898, 1903)
- Other publications (see for example The Cambridge Chronicle, The Muskogee, the Daily Phoenix, and the Birmingham [UK] Gazette)
