= Rindge Towers =

Affordable housing development in Cambridge, Massachusetts, U.S.

Coordinates: 42.3930°N 71.13895°W

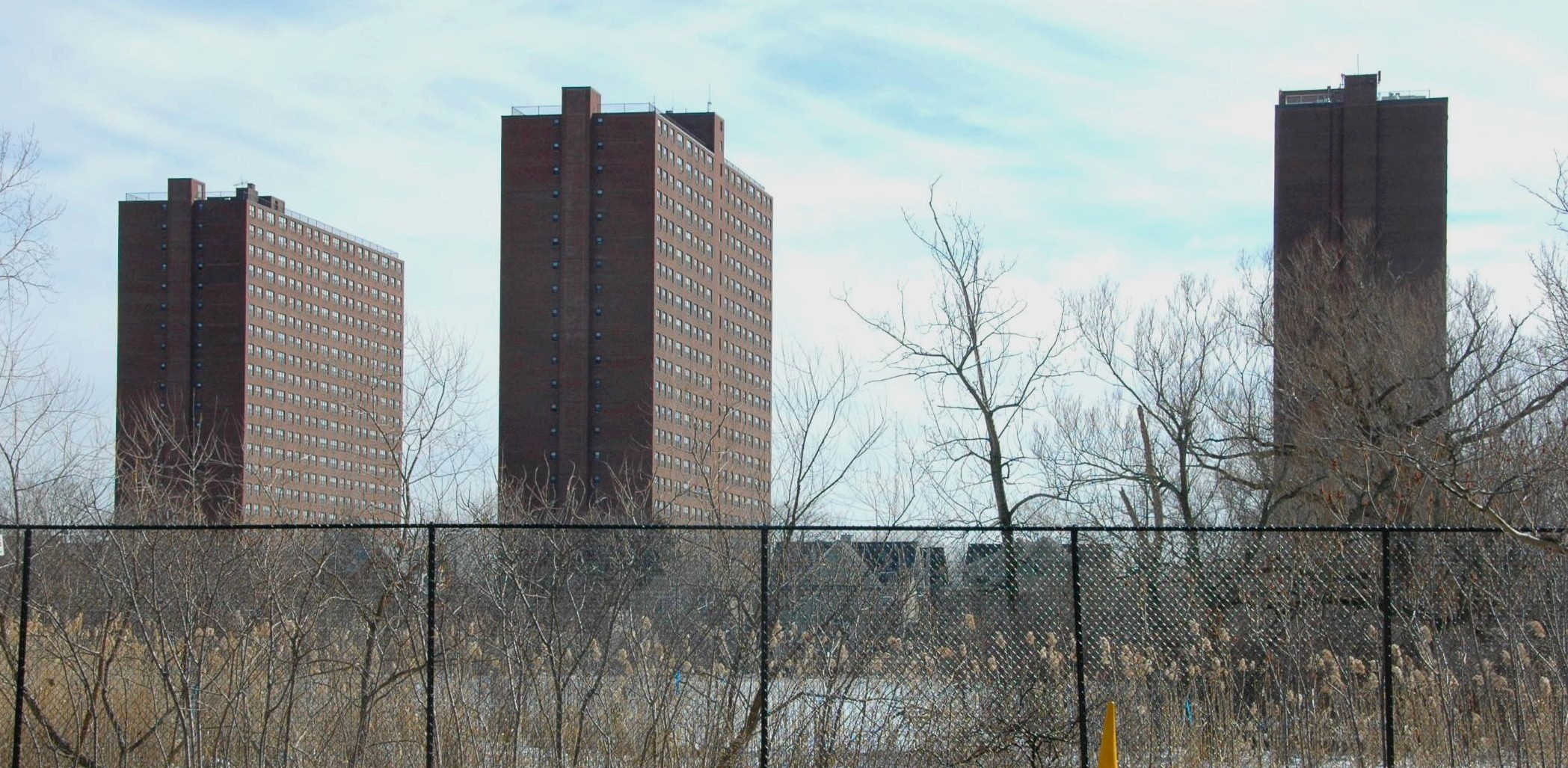
Rindge Towers, seen from the north

Rindge Towers is an affordable housing development in Cambridge, Massachusetts. Completed in 1970, the three 22-story towers make up a 777-unit apartment complex located in close proximity to the Alewife MBTA station at the terminus of the Red Line. The towers are named for Frederick H. Rindge, the philanthropist who funded construction of Cambridge Rindge and Latin School, Cambridge City Hall, and the Cambridge Public Library.

The towers are built in the Le Corbusier style, which advocated dense high-rise housing complexes set within parks and open spaces. This style has since fallen out of fashion in favor of mixed-use and mixed-income development. Also known as "Fresh Pond Apartments I, II and III", the buildings are by far the tallest in North Cambridge; their height is estimated at 269 feet (82 m).

Originally constructed to spur development in the Alewife region of Cambridge, the towers—like many high-rise housing projects of the era—quickly became associated with crime and fell into disrepair. Living conditions at the towers have improved from their nadir in the 1980s. However, the complex is still a focus for law enforcement activity, and in 2008 the Cambridge Police opened a substation at the towers.

== See also ==
- List of tallest buildings and structures in Cambridge, Massachusetts
