= River Point =

Office skyscraper in Chicago, Illinois

Coordinates: 41.886164°N 87.639576°W

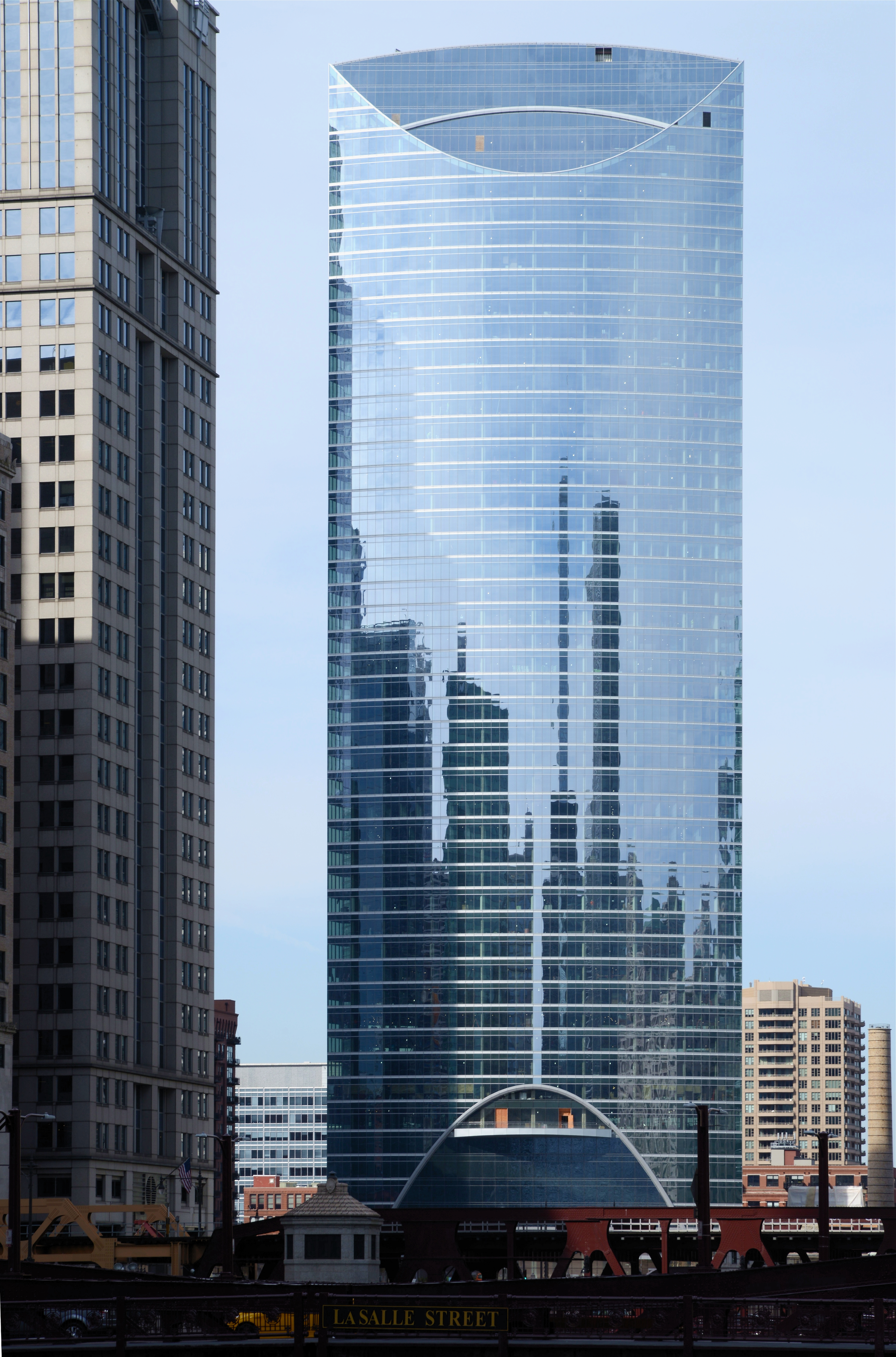
- River Point

- Location within Chicago metropolitan area Location within Illinois Location within the United States
- Former names: 200 North Riverside Plaza

General information
- Status: Completed
- Type: Office
- Location: 444 West Lake Street, Chicago, Illinois
- Construction started: 2013
- Completed: 2017
- Opening: 2017
- Owner: Ivanhoé Cambridge; Hines Interests; The Levy Organization; River Point Holdings

Height
- Roof: 732 ft (223 m)

Technical details
- Floor count: 52
- Floor area: 92,900 m^{2} (1,000,000 sq ft)

Design and construction
- Architect: Pickard Chilton
- Developer: Hines Interests Limited Partnership
- Structural engineer: Magnusson Klemencic Associates
- Main contractor: Clark Construction; Lendlease

River Point, previously known as 200 North Riverside Plaza, is a 52-story 730 ft. (213 m) tall skyscraper in Chicago, Illinois, located at 444 West Lake Street. The 52-story building has 1 million square feet (93,000 m^{2}) of floor space. It sits on air rights above active railroad tracks and as well the subway portion of the CTA Blue Line, which affected the angle of some support columns, which in turn produced the parabolic arch in the base of the building.

== Groundbreaking and main tenants ==
It was developed by Hines and designed by Pickard Chilton. The building was designed before the Great Recession of the early 21st century, and constructed after it. A groundbreaking ceremony was held for the tower in January 2013. The building has Gold LEED certification. The US Green Building Council indicates that the River Point building achieved Platinum LEEDS status as of January 30, 2019.

The building became the headquarters of Morton Salt in December 2016. The anchor tenant is the law firm McDermott Will & Emery, which occupies 225,000 sq ft (20,900 m^{2}) of office space, and it moved in to River Point in March 2017. Mead Johnson also relocated its headquarters from suburban Glenview to the building.

== Location ==
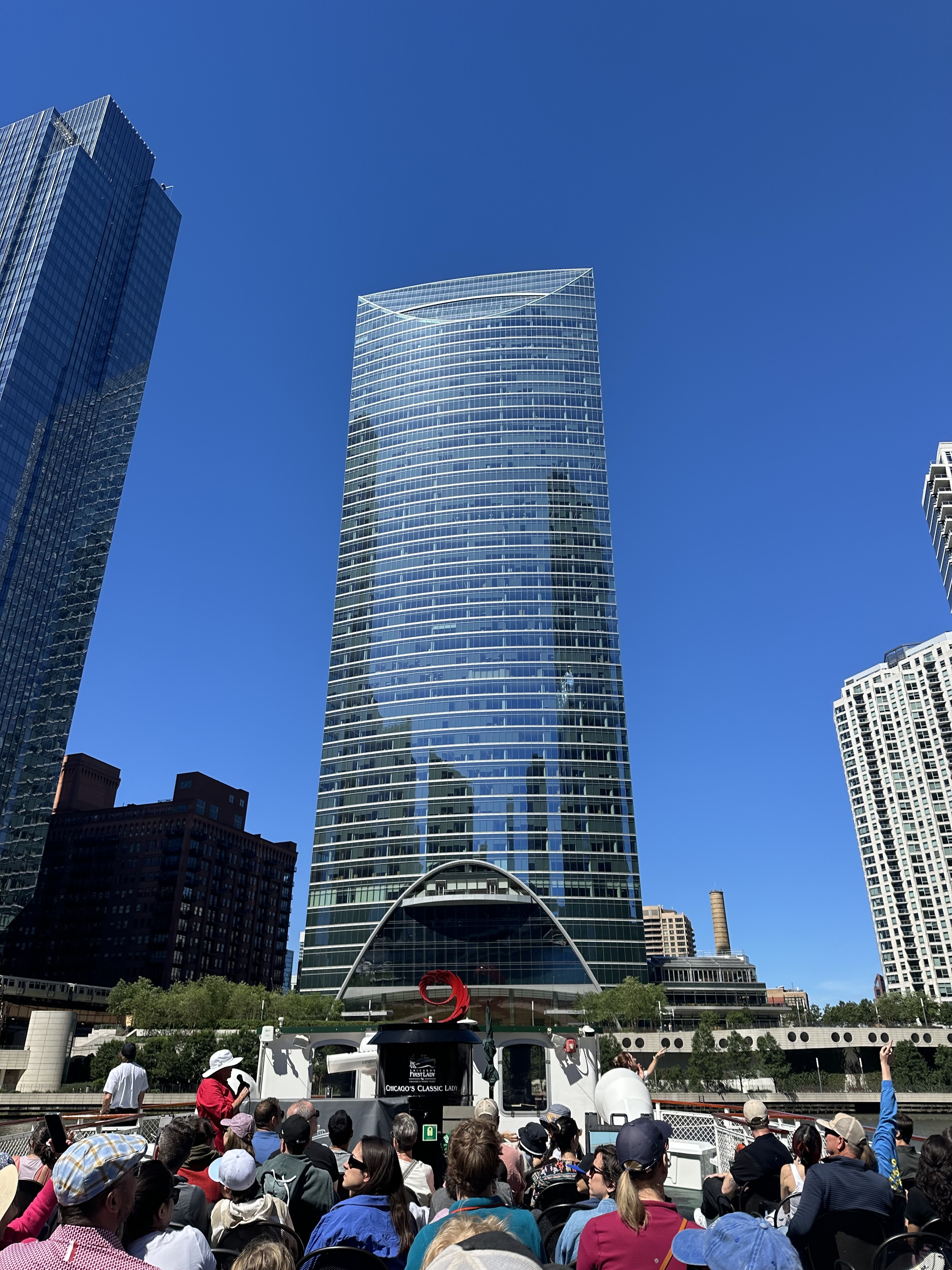
River Point from the Chicago River in July 2024

The land on which this tower stands is known as River Point because it lies at the point where the North and South branches of the Chicago River form.

It is between Canal Street and the Chicago River, and was the tallest building in Chicago west of the Chicago River until it was overtaken by 150 North Riverside, completed a few months later in 2017, which is also built on air rights over the railroad tracks leading into Union Station to the south of both properties.

As required by the city of Chicago, the building also includes a 1.5-acre (0.61 ha) public park and a landscaped riverwalk that is open to the public. To accommodate the land required for the public park and river walk it is built over a set of active railroad tracks.

== Reception ==
The building's design reflects its location well, where the two branches of the Chicago River begin, with critic Blair Kamin noting "its exuberant curves" and how it reflects the river, like the "great 1983 high-rise" building across the river from it, 333 Wacker Drive. It was the first new downtown skyscraper to open in seven years, due to the Great Recession. Kamin points out how the structure of this building is affected by the once-surface railroad tracks and the CTA Blue Line subway tunnel running beneath it, requiring a tilt in some support columns. That tilt results in "the building's most distinctive feature: the tall parabolic arch at its base". Kamin concludes that the site demanded, and this building delivered "a memorable statement".

== See also ==
- List of tallest buildings in Chicago
