= Pickard Chilton =

Architecture studio in New Haven, Connecticut

- Industry: Architecture
- Founded: 1997
- Headquarters: New Haven, Connecticut
- Website: pickardchilton.com

Pickard Chilton is an architecture studio founded in 1997 by Jon Pickard and William Chilton. Based in New Haven, Connecticut, the firm designs corporate headquarters, commercial office towers, hotels, and academic and health care facilities. The studio has completed projects for clients such as Hines, Mitsui Fudosan, ExxonMobil, Northwestern Mutual, Devon Energy, Mutual of Omaha, and Skanska.

== History ==
Pickard Chilton was founded in 1997 by Jon Pickard and William Chilton. Based in New Haven, Connecticut, the studio has completed projects in multiple countries including Japan, Germany, and across North America.

== Projects & Approach ==
Pickard Chilton has worked on large-scale, mixed-use urban developments, that include office, hospitality, and public space components. The studio designed the master plan for the Takanawa Gateway City in Tokyo, which includes office, hotel, and retail spaces.

Several of Pickard Chilton's projects incorporate sustainable features: Avocet Tower and AC Hotel by Marriott includes high-efficiency air systems, bio-retention roofs, and EV charging stations, while River Point in Chicago features low-flow fixtures and native landscaping on a 50% green roof. In 2021, the firm added nearly 11-million-square-feet of new work to its existing contracts of 19-million-square-feet, including the Sherwin-Williams Headquarters in Cleveland. The firm also designed 1144 Fifteenth in Denver. Building Design+Construction included the project among its top 10 projects.

== Notable Projects ==
Selected projects include:

- 1180 Peachtree – Atlanta, Georgia (2006)
- 300 North LaSalle – Chicago, Illinois (2009)
- Devon Energy Center – Oklahoma City, Oklahoma (2012)
- 609 Main at Texas – Houston, Texas (2017)
- River Point – Chicago, Illinois (2017)
- Northwestern Mutual Tower and Commons – Milwaukee, Wisconsin (2017)
- Barack H. Obama Magnet University School – New Haven, Connecticut (2019)
- Qualtrics Tower (also known as 2+U) – Seattle, Washington (2020)
- Norfolk Southern Headquarters – Atlanta, Georgia (2021)
- Tokyo Midtown Yaesu – Tokyo, Japan (2023)
- ExxonMobil Global Campus – Houston, Texas (2014)
- Google Cambridge – Cambridge, Massachusetts (2024)
- The Eight – Bellevue, Washington (2024)

== Recent Work ==
- Mutual of Omaha Headquarters – Omaha, Nebraska (under construction)
- Sherwin-Williams Headquarters – Cleveland, Ohio (under construction)
- Takanawa Global Gateway – Tokyo, Japan
- Le Coeur – Düsseldorf, Germany
- T3 RiNo – Denver, Colorado

Several Pickard Chilton projects are featured in lists of the tallest buildings, including:

- Cambridge, Massachusetts – Akamai Technologies Headquarters; Google Cambridge
- Arizona – 24th at Camelback I and II
- Salt Lake City, Utah – Sundial Tower

== Awards and Recognition ==
- AIA Connecticut Emerging Architects Award (2016, 2019, 2022, 2024)
- AIA New England Emerging Professional Friendly Firm (2018, 2020)
- JEDI Challenge Award (2022, 2024)

== Project-Specific Awards ==
- 2011 ULI The Americas Award – 300 North LaSalle
- 2015 ULI Global Awards for Excellence – Devon Energy Center
- 2018 Emporis Top Ten Skyscrapers – 1144 Fifteenth Ranks Fifth
- 2019 American Architecture Awards – Northwestern Mutual Tower and Commons; ATCO Headquarters
- 2019 Prairie Wood Design Award – ATCO Headquarters
- 2021 AIA New England Design Awards Best of Connecticut Award – River Point; Citation Award: Eaton House
- 2022 SARA National Design Award – 2+U
- 2025 Bellevue Downtown Association (BDA) Placemaking Award – The Eight
