= North Point (Cambridge, Massachusetts) =

Neighborhood in East Cambridge, Massachusetts

Coordinates: 42°22′20.6″N 71°4′30.2″W

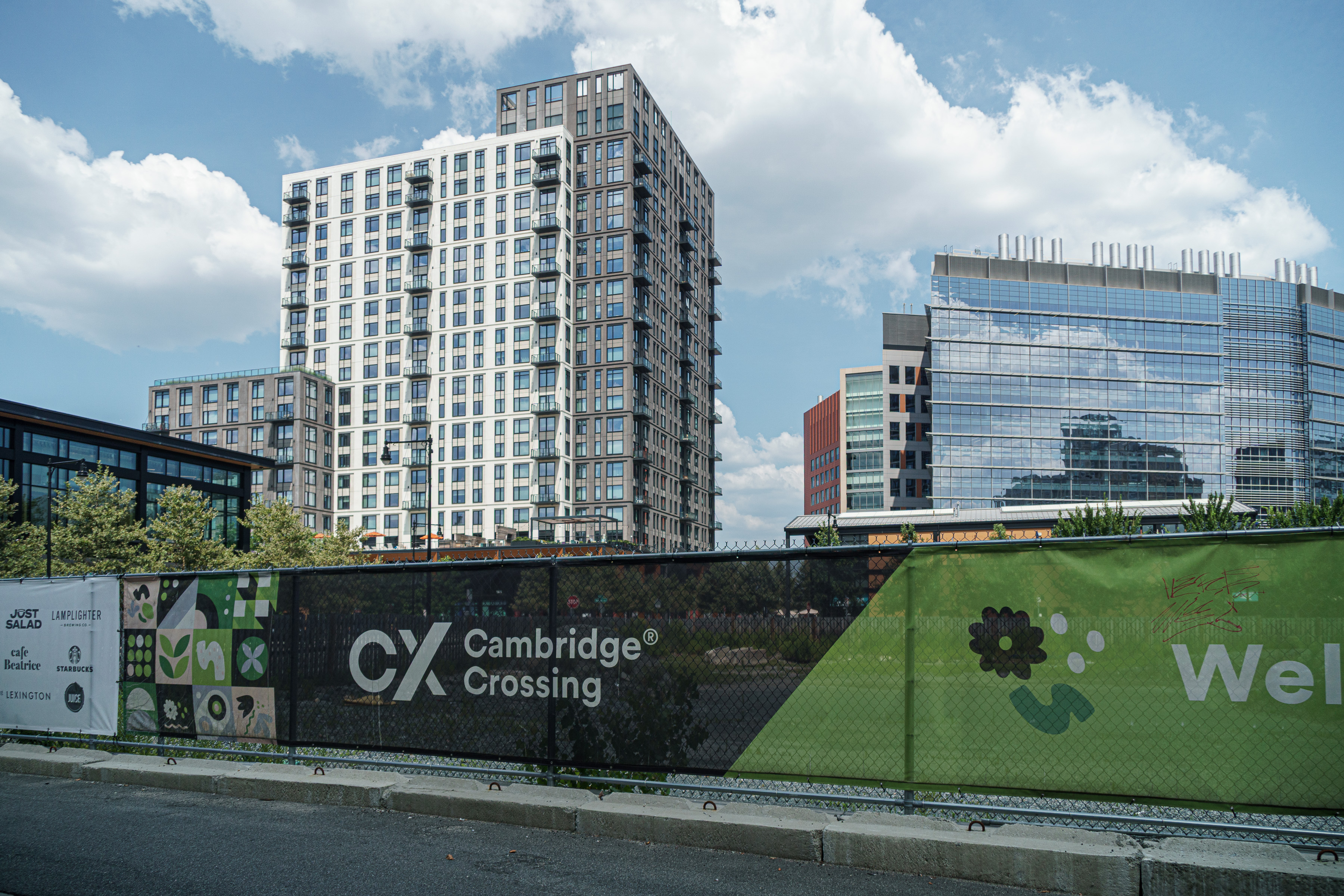
Welcome to Cambridge Crossing

North Point is a neighborhood within the East Cambridge section of Cambridge, Massachusetts. A former railroad yard, the site was originally built by the Boston and Maine Railroad. It is triangular in shape and bound by the MBTA Commuter Rail Fitchburg Line, the Charles River and associated dam with the Lechmere Viaduct, the former Lechmere wetlands, and Millers River remnant that once divided Cambridge and Charlestown, along with the Interstate 93 Northern Expressway viaduct to the northeast.

== Cambridge Crossing ==
Companies at Cambridge Crossing

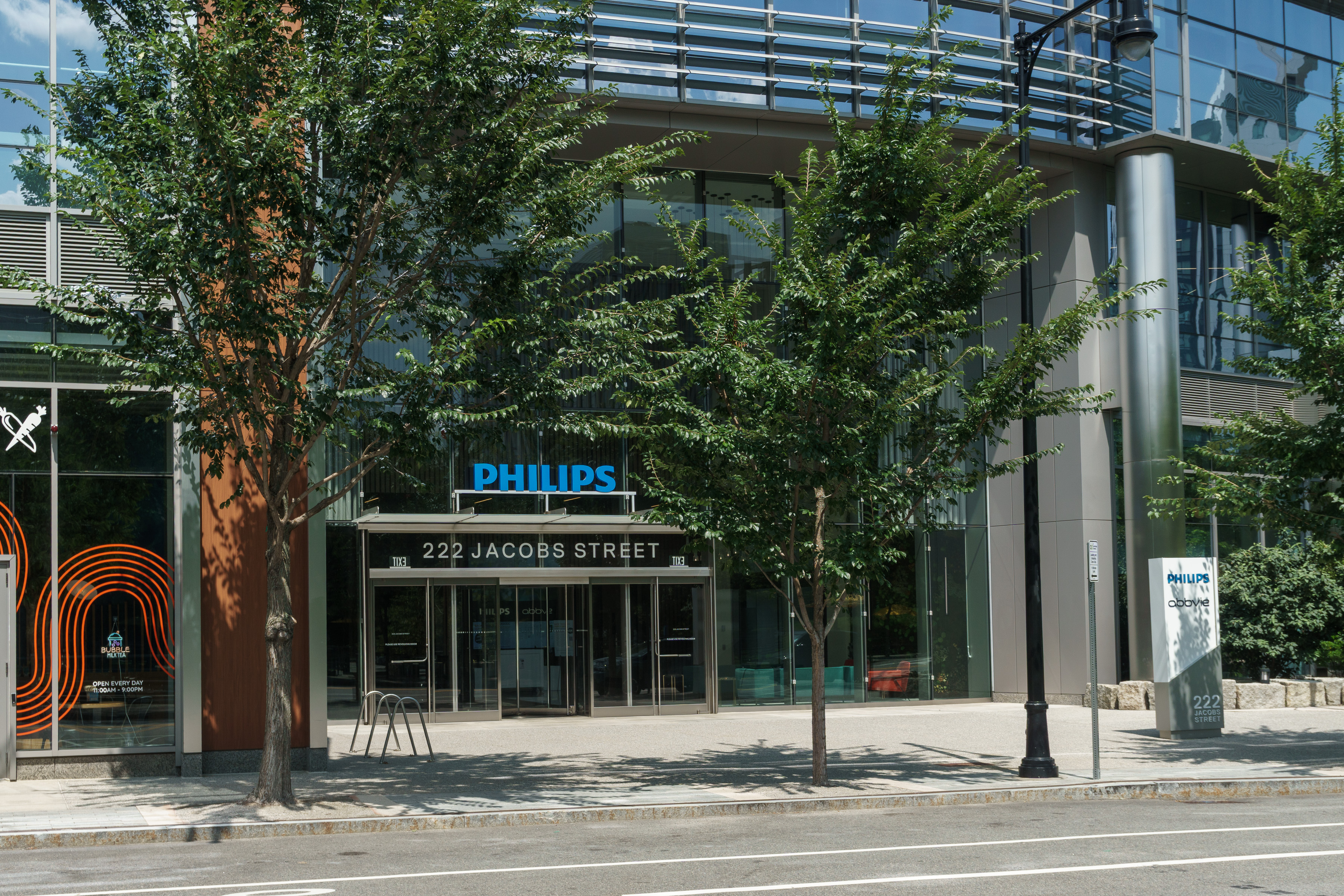
Philips at 222 Jacobs Street

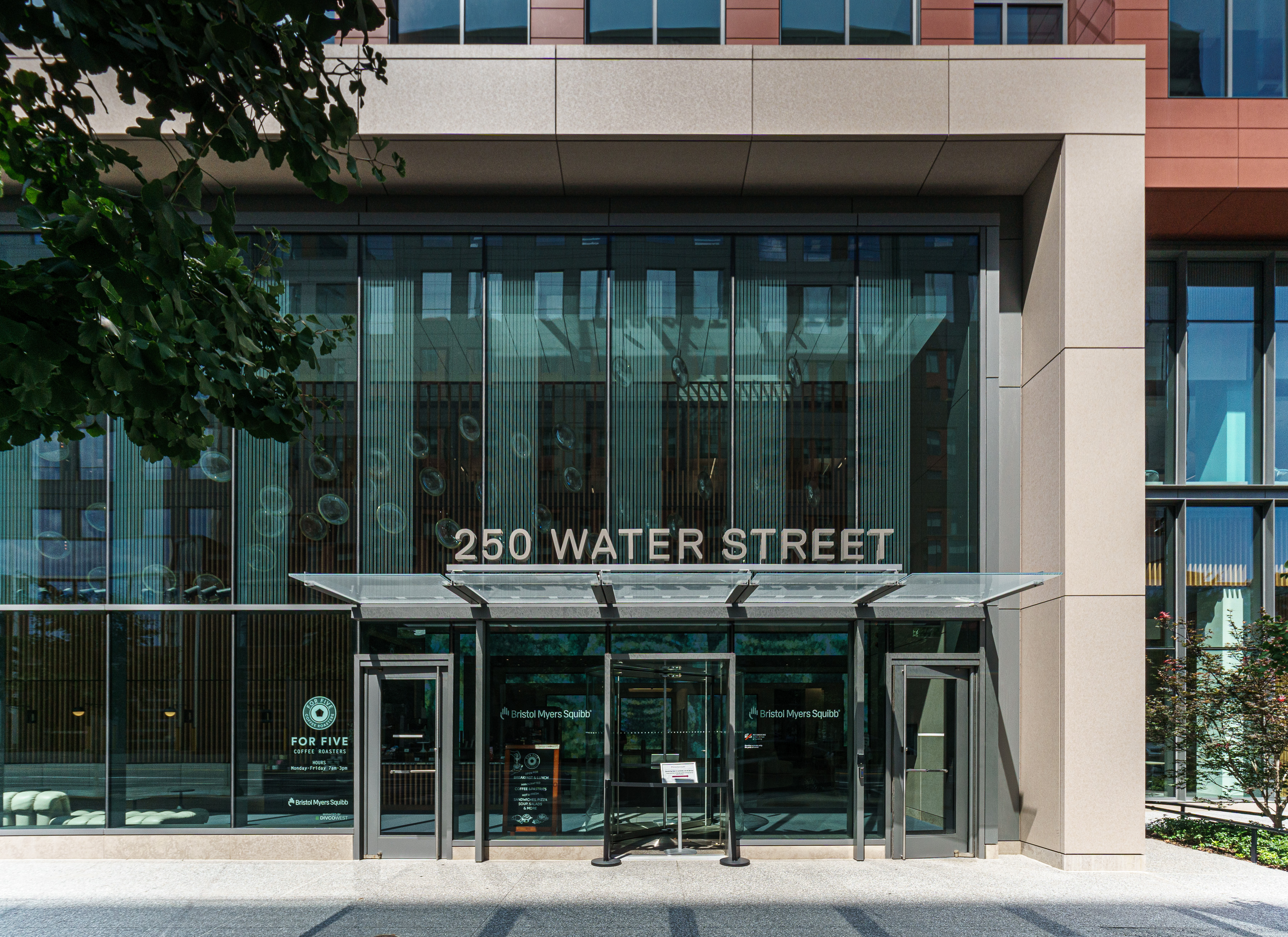
Bristol-Myers Squibb at 250 Water Street

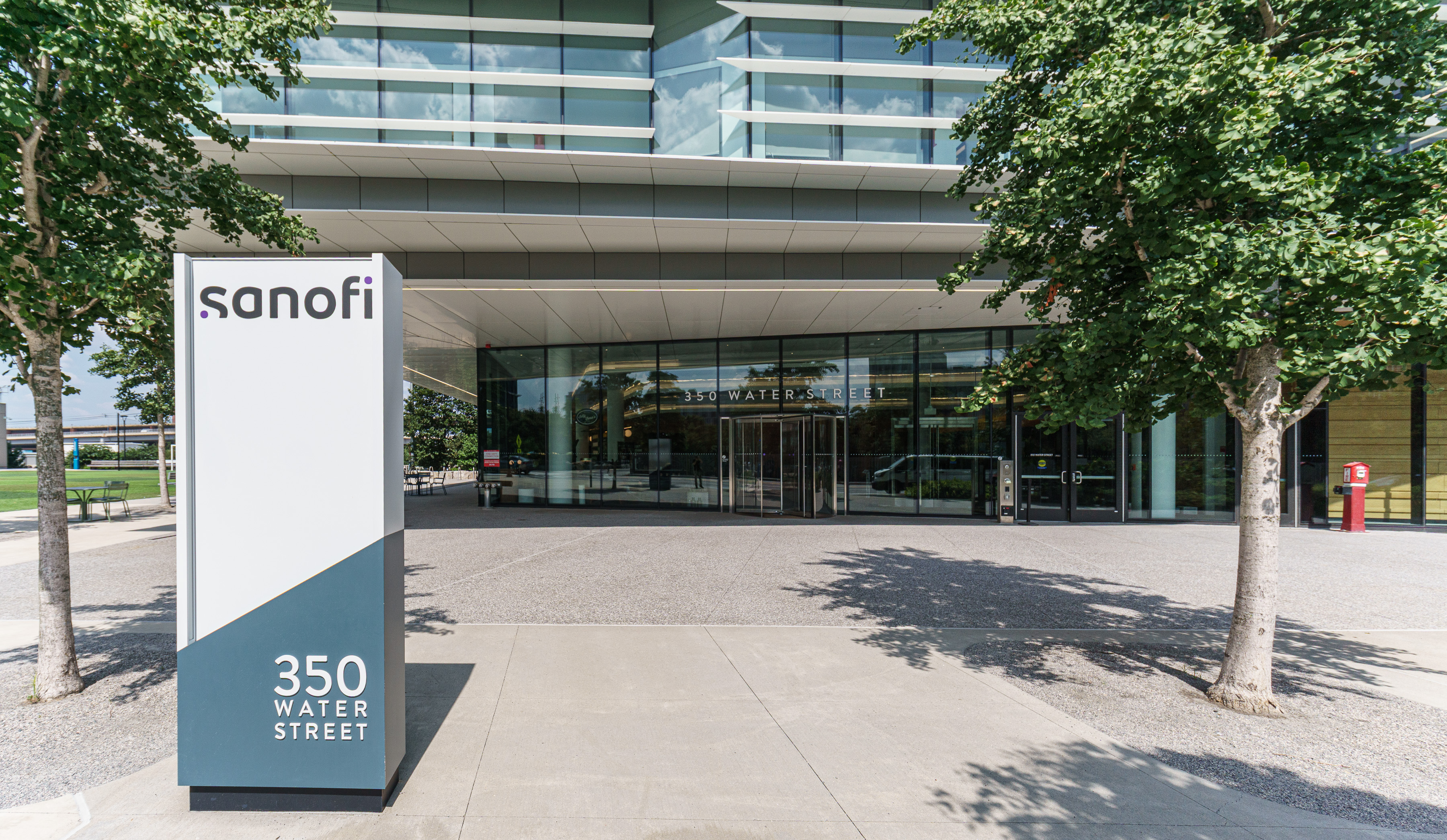
Sanofi at 350 Water Street

After development continued in the area surrounding, it was decided to turn portions of the now-unused rail yard area into a large development, containing commercial, retail and residential development, along with a relocated Lechmere Green Line transit station. The area was master planned and partially constructed under the name NorthPoint, from which the neighborhood received its name. After development stalled, a different developer, DivcoWest, took over the remainder of the site and named it Cambridge Crossing. A new master plan envisioned a center for innovation and collaboration with a central retail hub surrounded by acres of open space.

== Transportation ==
North Point is positioned between two MBTA stations (Lechmere on the Green Line and Community College on the Orange Line), adjacent to Kendall Square, one MBTA stop away from North Station. Lechmere opened on March 21, 2022 as part of the Green Line Extension project.

== Construction phases ==
Completed as of January 2022 are two original North Point buildings containing condominiums, one life science building, one retail and office building, and a central retail building along with acres of green space. In progress as of January 2022 are four life science buildings and one residential building. Phase 2 includes additional life science, residential and retail buildings along with new streets being constructed. The final plans for the complete area include 4.5 million square feet of commercial, residential, and retail buildings and 11 acres of open and green space, including a segment of the Mass Central Rail Trail.
