= MIT Campus (Area 2), Cambridge, Massachusetts =

Coordinates: 42°21′35.1″N 71°5′31.4″W

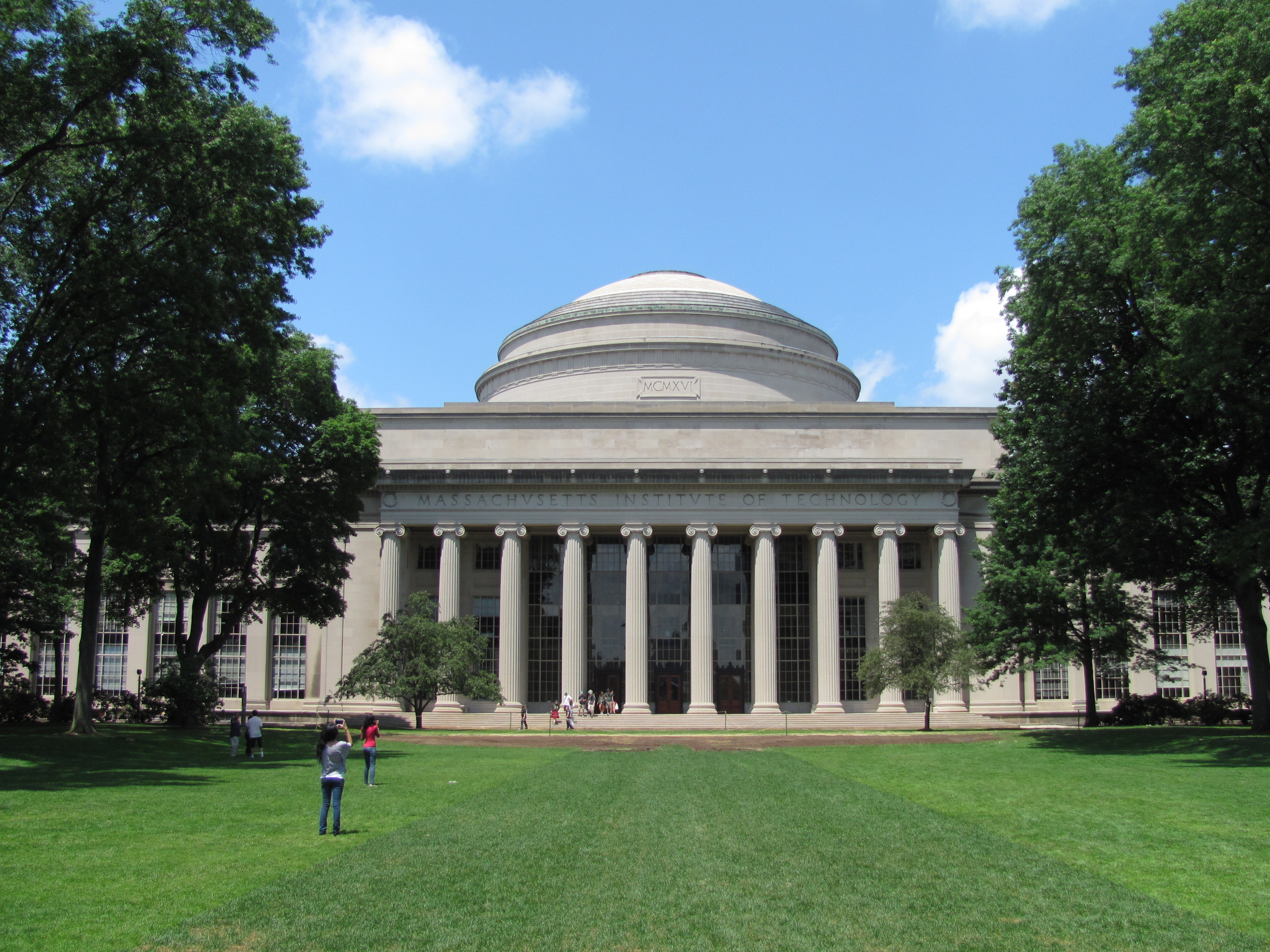
MIT Building 10 and the Great Dome

The area around the campus of the Massachusetts Institute of Technology, or MIT, makes up Area 2 of Cambridge, Massachusetts. Area 2 is bounded by Main Street and Broadway on the north, the railroad tracks on the west, and the Charles River on the south and east. Its population in 2005 was 5,486 residents living in 794 households. The average household income was $37,287.
