= La Grande Voile (The Big Sail) =

Sculpture in Cambridge, Massachusetts, U.S.

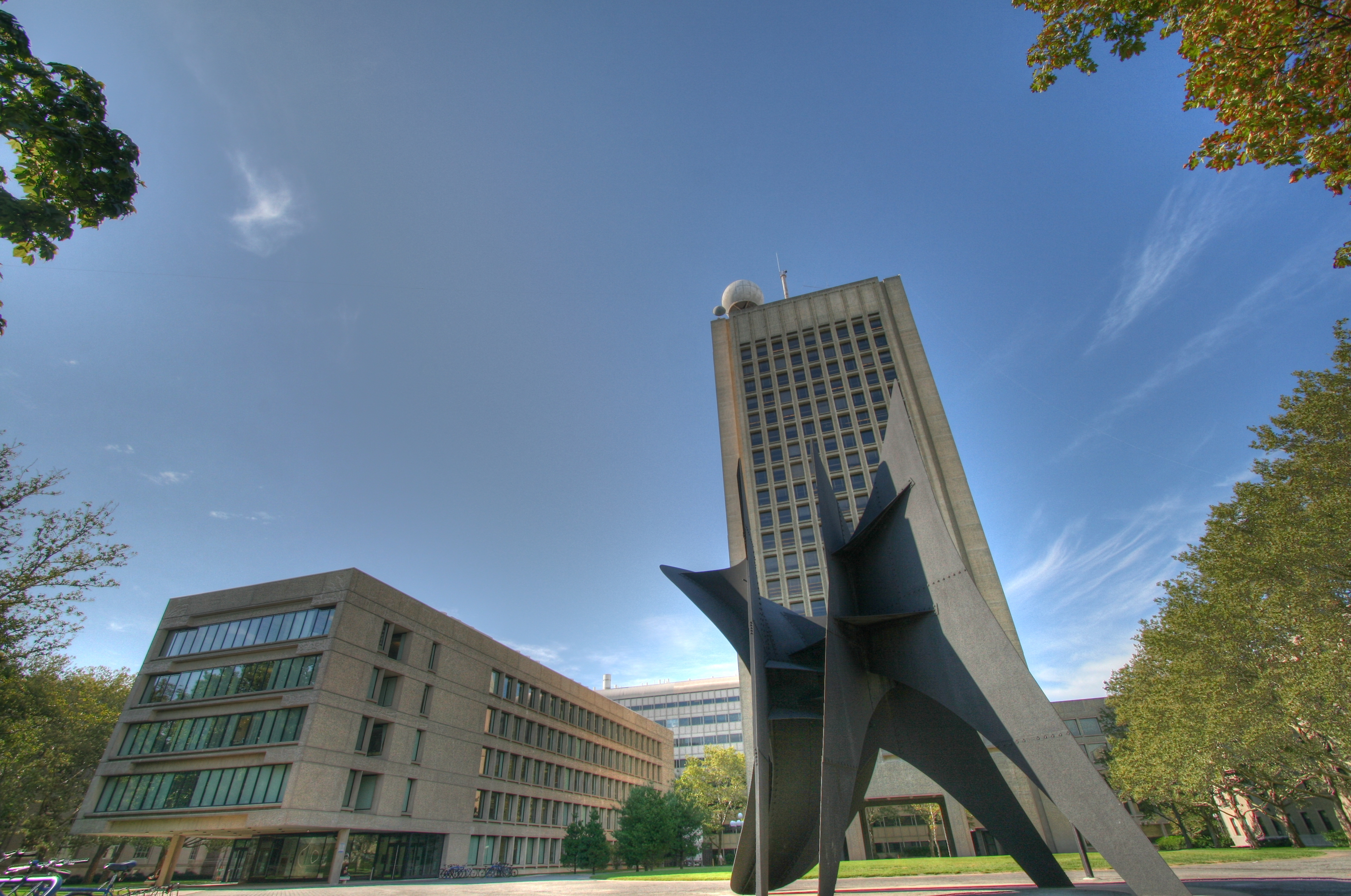
- The sculpture in McDermott Court, 2008
- Artist: Alexander Calder
- Year: 1965
- Medium: Steel sculpture
- Location: Cambridge, Massachusetts, U.S.; 42.359734°N 71.088975°W

La Grande Voile (The Big Sail), sometimes translated The Great Sail, is a 1965 painted steel sculpture by Alexander Calder, installed in McDermott Court on the Massachusetts Institute of Technology (MIT) campus in Cambridge, Massachusetts, United States.

== See also ==
- 1965 in art
- List of Alexander Calder public works
