= North Cambridge, Massachusetts =

Neighborhood of Cambridge, Massachusetts, United States

Coordinates: 42°23′45″N 71°07′48″W

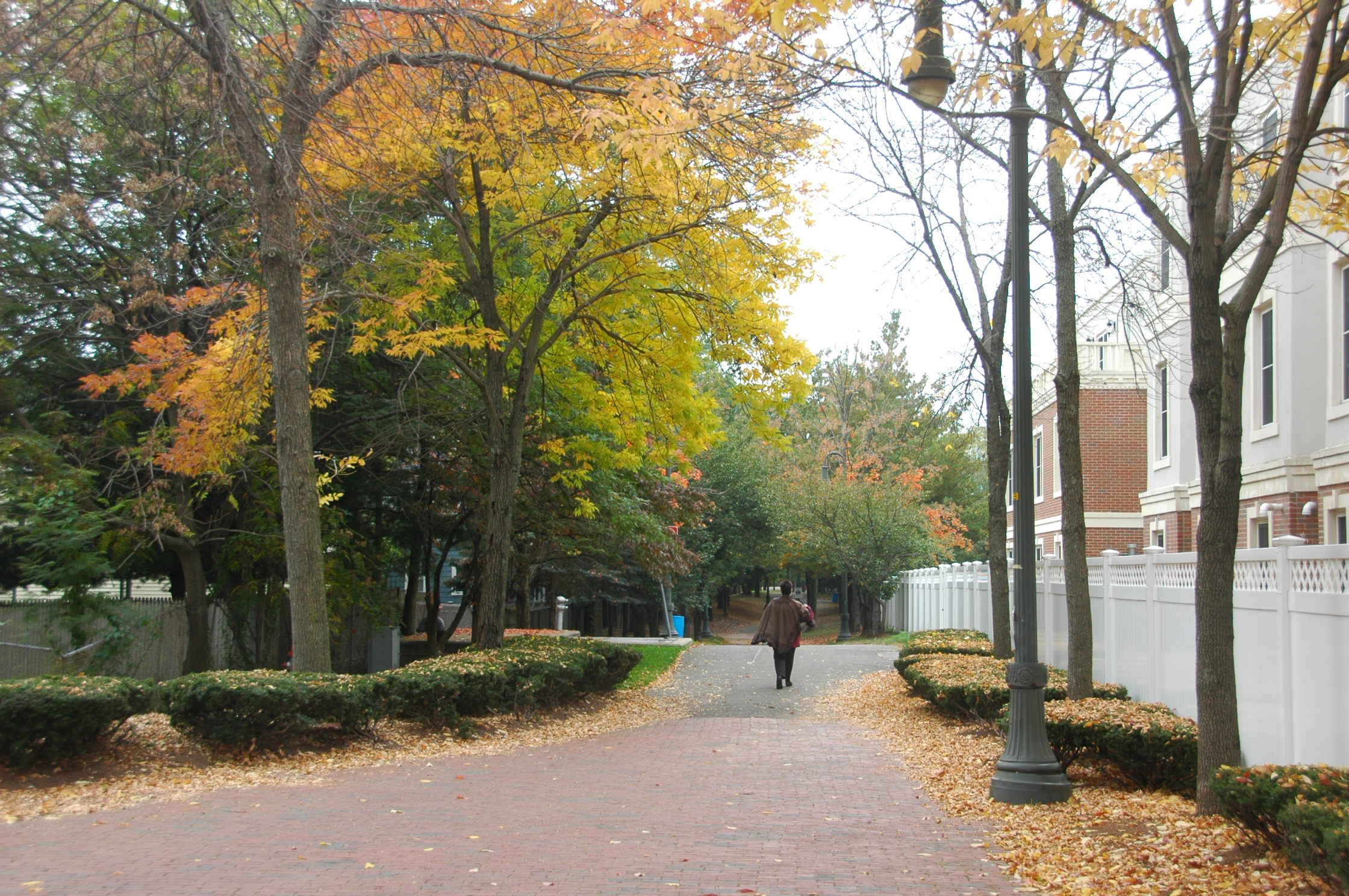
Autumn in the Alewife Linear Park, near the corner of Cedar Street and Massachusetts Avenue, North Cambridge

North Cambridge, also known as "Area 11", is a neighborhood of Cambridge, Massachusetts bounded by Porter Square and the Fitchburg Line railroad tracks on the south, the city of Somerville on the northeast, Alewife Brook and the town of Arlington on the northwest, and the town of Belmont on the west. In 2005 it had a population of 10,642 residents living in 4,699 households, and the average income was $44,784. In 2010, the racial demographics for the neighborhood were 57.6% White, 20% Black, 15.1% Asian/Pacific Islander, 7.3% Hispanic origin, 0.3% Native American, 2.4% other race.

The main commercial areas of North Cambridge are situated along Alewife Brook Parkway and Massachusetts Avenue. A third area, Davis Square, in Somerville, also exerts considerable influence on the North Cambridge neighborhood.

Four roads span the railroad tracks, connecting the bulk of North Cambridge with other neighborhoods of Cambridge. From east to west, these are: Mass. Ave. (route MA-2A), Walden Street, Sherman Street (grade crossing), and Alewife Brook Parkway (carrying routes MA-2, MA-16, and US-3).

The Alewife Triangle is relatively isolated by a combination of the Fitchburg line, Alewife Brook Parkway, and Alewife Brook. The city has proposed bridging or building over the Fitchburg line to connect with Cambridge Highlands, and adding a commuter rail station.

== Notable residents ==
- Thomas Danehy
- Pauline Elizabeth Hopkins
- Tip O'Neill
- Josiah Porter
- Reverend Peter Thomas Stanford

== Tallest buildings and structures ==
- Northview Condominium, a 9-story 66-unit building located on 2353 Massachusetts Avenue. The building was formed in 1973.
- Rindge Towers (Fresh Pond Apartments)

== See also ==
- Alewife Linear Park
- Lexington and West Cambridge Railroad
- St. John the Evangelist Church
- Walden Street Cattle Pass
- Watson's Corner
