= One United Nations Plaza =

Hotel in Manhattan, New York

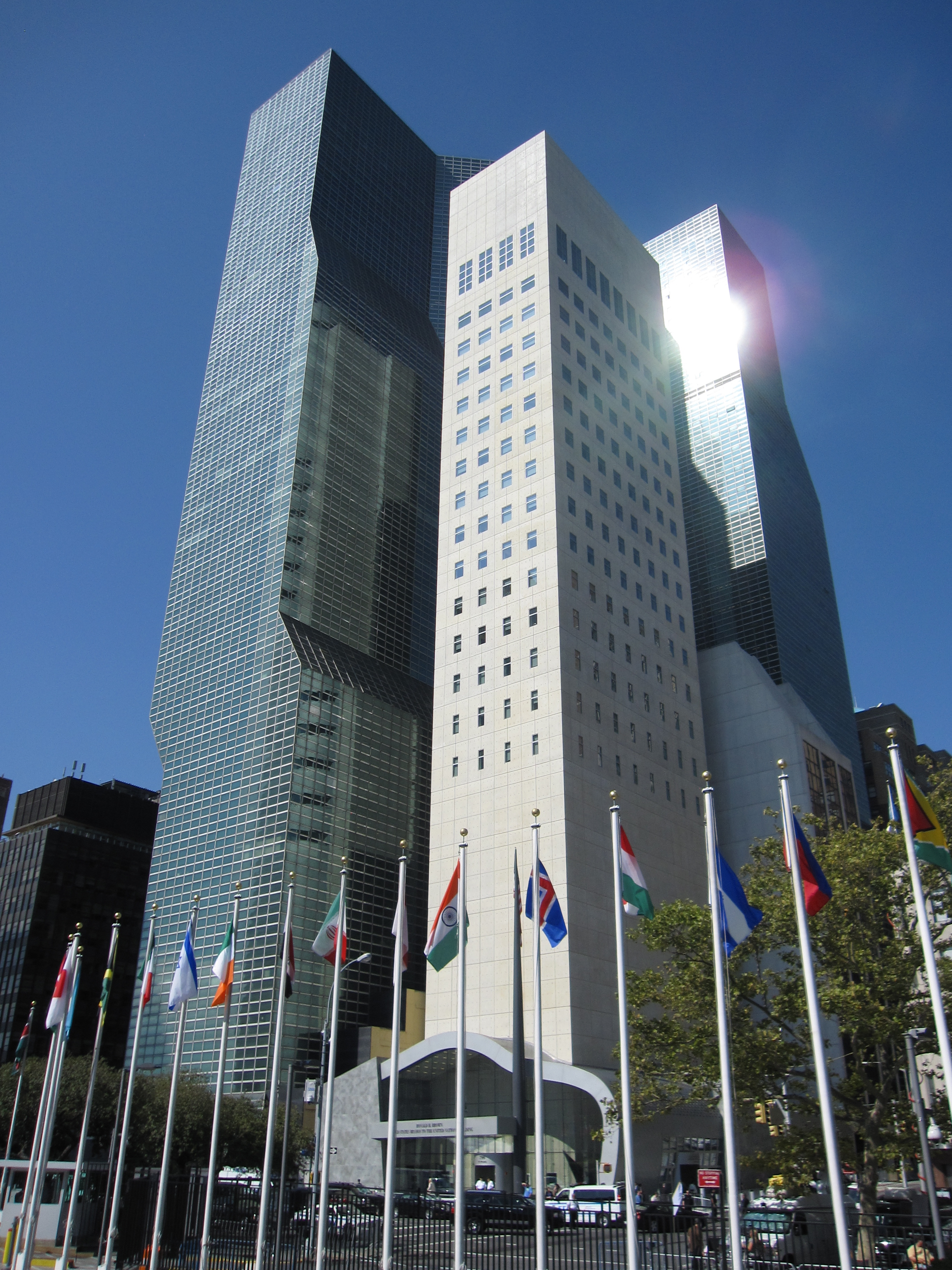
- One (far left) and Two (far right) United Nations Plaza viewed southwest from across United Nations Plaza Street. The beige-colored building between Towers 1 and 2 is the US Mission to the UN.
- Former names: United Nations Plaza Hotel, Millennium UN Plaza
- Hotel chain: Hilton Hotels

General information
- Type: Hotel/Office
- Architectural style: Modern
- Location: 1 United Nations Plaza, Manhattan, New York City, United States
- Coordinates: 40°45′02″N 73°58′09″W
- Current tenants: Millennium Hilton New York One UN Plaza and UNDC tenants
- Completed: 1976; 50 years ago
- Opened: One UN Plaza ― November 10, 1975
- Owner: UNDC and Millennium & Copthorne Hotels
- Landlord: UNDC & Millennium & Copthorne Hotels

Height
- Height: 496 ft (151 m)—505 ft (154 m),
- Architectural: Modern architecture

Technical details
- Material: steel (frame)
- Floor count: 44 (Note: The hotel occupies floors 27–39 in both One and Two United Nations Plaza buildings have 44 stories.)

Design and construction
- Architects: Kevin Roche & John Dinkeloo for One UN Plaza
- Architecture firm: Roche-Dinkeloo
- Main contractor: Turner Construction

Other information
- Number of rooms: 439
- Facilities: Ambassador Grill; Millennium Health and Racquet Club

Website
- undc.org

New York City Landmark
- Designated: January 17, 2017
- Reference no.: 2588
- Designated entity: Interior: Millennium Hilton New York One UN Plaza, Lobby and Ambassador Grill

One United Nations Plaza is a mixed-use building in Turtle Bay, Manhattan that was designed for the United Nations by Kevin Roche & John Dinkeloo.

== Description ==
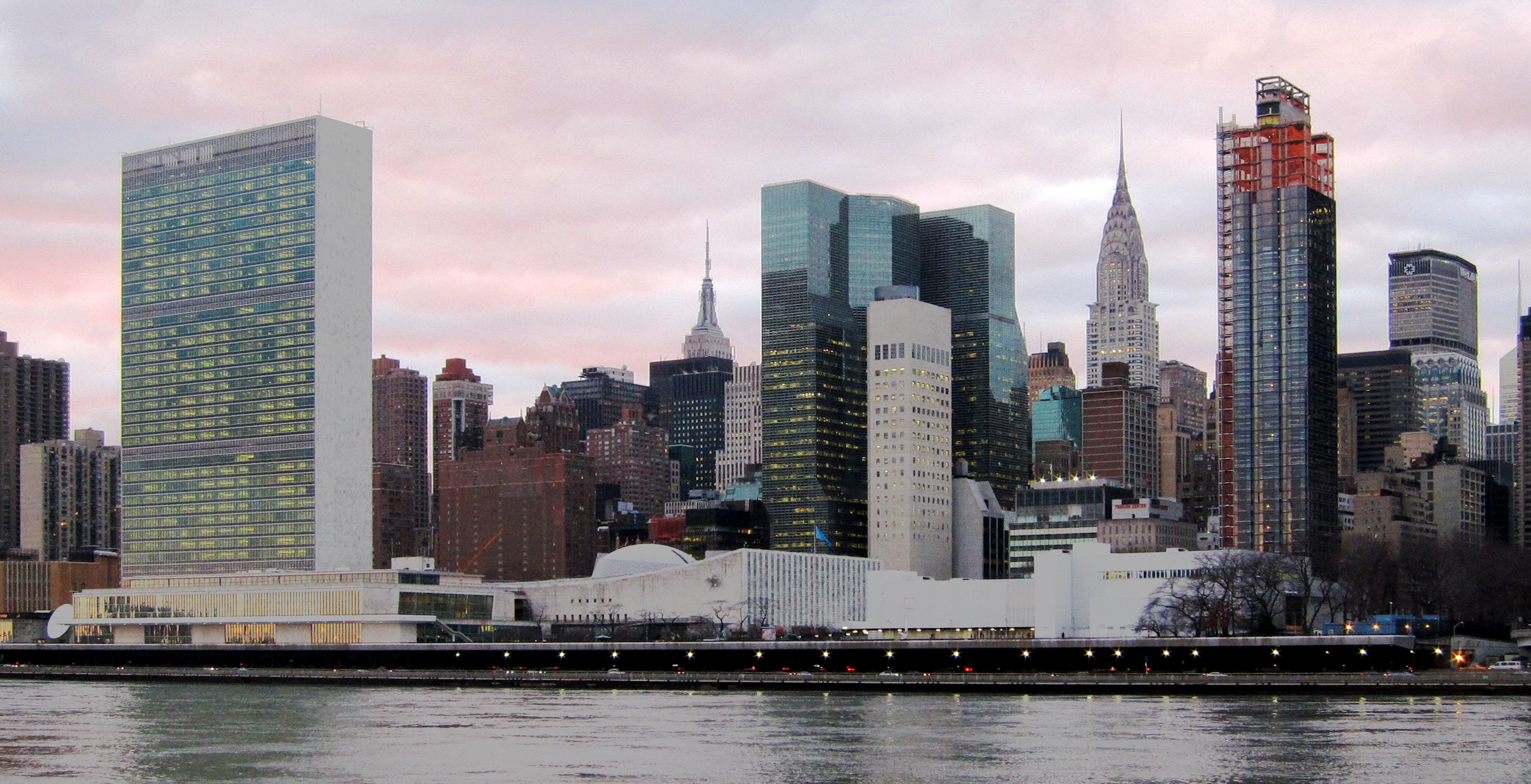
One and Two United Nations Plaza in center, dwarfing the US Mission to the UN, viewed from Roosevelt Island. The UN Secretariat is on the left.

One UN Plaza is a mixed-use building in Turtle Bay, Manhattan that was designed for the United Nations by Kevin Roche and John Dinkeloo. One UN Plaza is located across First Avenue from the UN headquarters in Midtown Manhattan of New York City. One UN Plaza is situated on the north side of 44th Street. The United Nations Development Corporation or UNDC is a quasi-public institution which developed and presently operates One UN Plaza. UNDC operates and maintains the office space at One UN Plaza. The hotel, which today occupies both One and Two UN Plaza, is operated by the Millennium Hotel Group and is known as the Millennium Hilton New York One UN Plaza. The hotel/office complex was built in stages due to public outcry and lack of funding. Due to a general economic recession and community opposition in the late 60s and early 70s, the large-scale plans for an office/hotel complex and conference space were tabled. Thus, One UN Plaza was built first in 1976. This was followed by Two UN Plaza in 1983. As the name suggests, UNDC's principal tenants are the United Nations, the UN Development Programme, UNICEF, and other missions to the UN. The Millennium Hilton New York One UN Plaza is a privately owned hotel and occupies the lobby, the upper floors, the swimming pool, and the tennis/racquetball courts.

One UN Plaza (also referred to as Tower One, D.C. 1, or simply "One") opened in 1975 and is a 39-story mixed-use office building and hotel, the first of its kind in New York City. It is located at the northwest corner of 44th Street and First Avenue. The building includes 420,000 square feet of office space on floors 2 through 26, hotel space on floors 2, then 27 through 39, and separate ground floor offices and hotel lobbies.

One UN Plaza is registered with the City of New York as "783–793 First Avenue and 335–343 East 44th Street, and 323–333 East 44th Street and 322–334 East 45th Street". They are landmark status buildings, known as Landmark Site of the Borough of Manhattan, Tax Map Block 1337, Lots 14 and 7502." Both were built in modern architectural design.

One UN Plaza is located on the east side of Midtown Manhattan along the East River, in an area known as Turtle Bay. One UN Plaza is adjacent to one of the most important buildings in the world: the United Nations. The group of One, Two, and Three UN Plaza buildings are in the most important part of Manhattan.

Location

"If Manhattan is the center of the City, midtown is the center of the center."

— AIA Guide to NYC, p. 204

If Manhattan is the center of the city (of all five boroughs), then Midtown Manhattan is the center of the hub. "Here are most of the elements one expects to find in a city core: the major railroad and bus stations, the vast majority of hotel rooms, the biggest stores, the main public library and post office. All are located in Turtle Bay."

=== Architecture ===
Roche-Dinkeloo planned One United Nations Plaza as a modern art building. It has a 505-foot-tall slab and 360,000 feet of office space on the first 26 floors and a 292-room hotel on the top thirteen floors. At 505 feet in height, the building is three feet shorter than the UN Secretariat, in line with zoning restrictions for the district. It is the first building in New York City to be both an office building and a hotel.

The builder for One UN Plaza was the Turner Construction Company. One UN Plaza was formally opened on November 20, 1975, after undergoing a tumultuous planning period which spanned almost a decade and two New York City mayoral administrations. The building was the newest addition to the United Nations, located to the east across the street on First Avenue.

== Features ==
Kevin Roche was intent on placing a tennis court inside One UN Plaza. He put it on the top floor.

One UN Plaza was designed and built between 1968 and 1975 for the UNDC. It was referred to by KRJDA as project number 6904, and Phase I of the UNDC's UN enclave with 590,000 square footage. Unlike the UN Secretariat which is oblong, One UN Plaza is an L-shaped building. Its footprint is hexagonal viewed from the top-down. There are some interesting setbacks in order to carefully integrate New York's zoning regulations: three architectural indentations which are not happenstance. According to Roche, there are three possibilities in designing skyscrapers to abide by the existing zoning laws in New York City, which will be discussed in this article. These possibilities were realistically "meant for rectangular buildings and blocks". By putting the tennis court on the top floor of the building, its dimensions were set. The first twenty-six floors were designed for office space, since they are the largest floors. The top eleven floors were designed for the hotel, with the smallest square footage. The hotel floors were required to be 65 feet, whereas the office floors were required to be wider. Hence, the walls slope inward from the offices to the hotel.

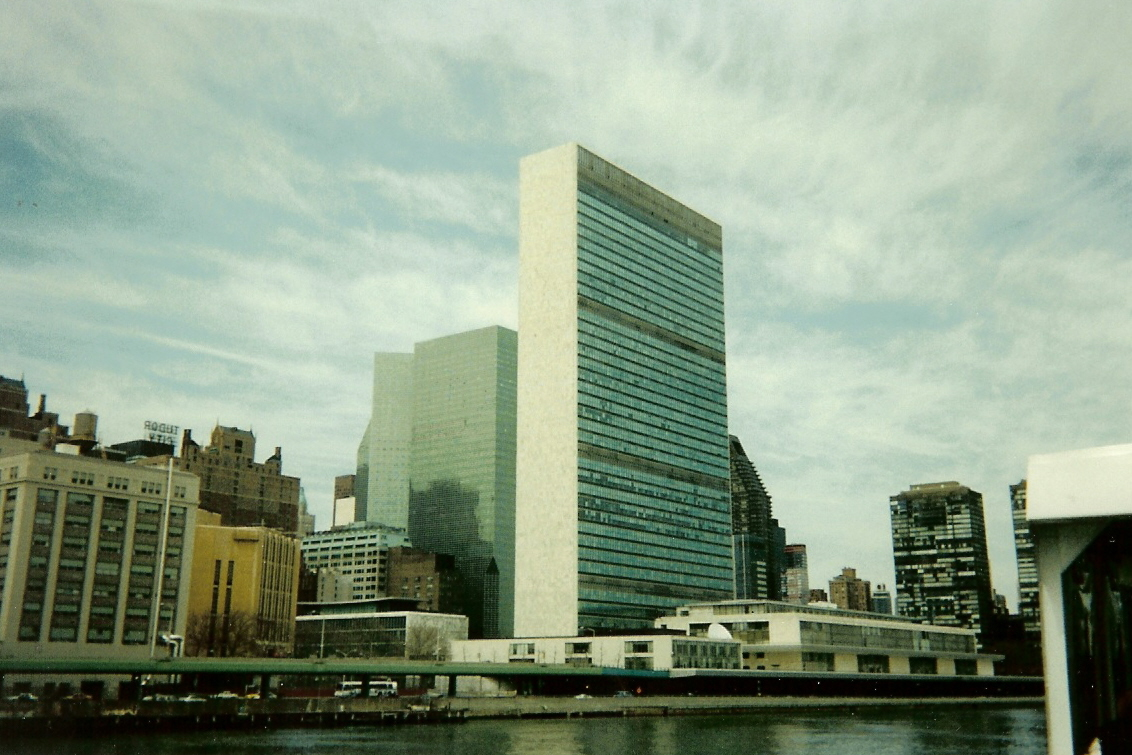
One UN Plaza viewed northwest from the East River by 22nd St. The UN Secretariat is center-right.

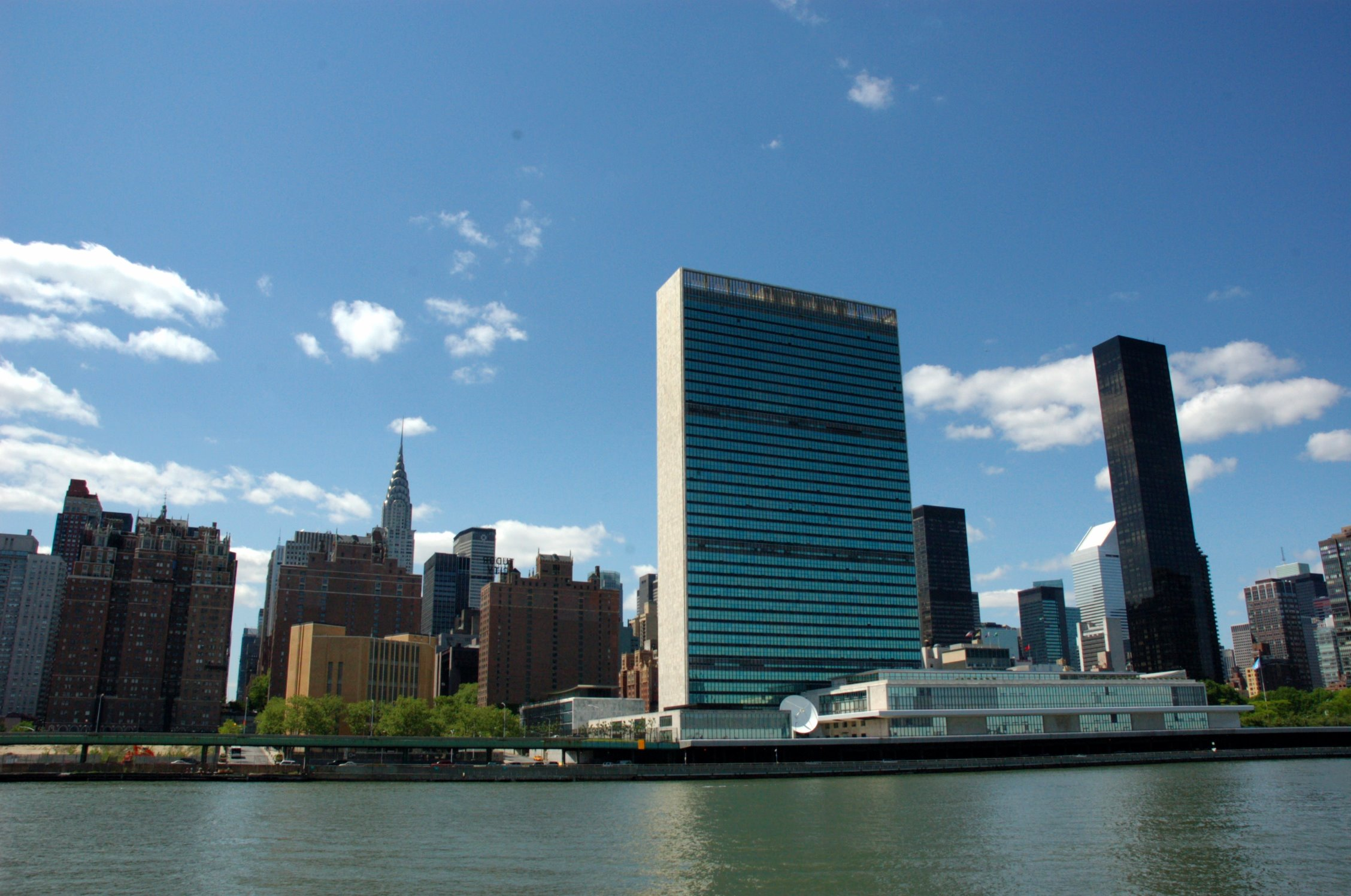
One UN Plaza viewed west-northwest from the East River by 39th St. The UN Secretariat is in the center.

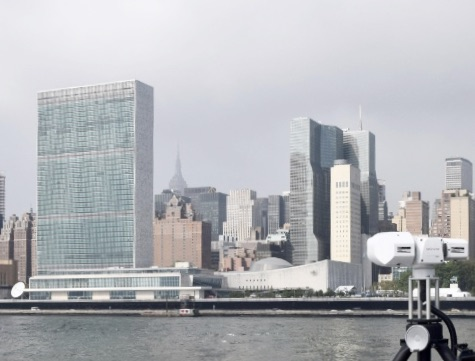
One UN Plaza viewed west from the East River by 48th St. The UN Secretariat is far left.

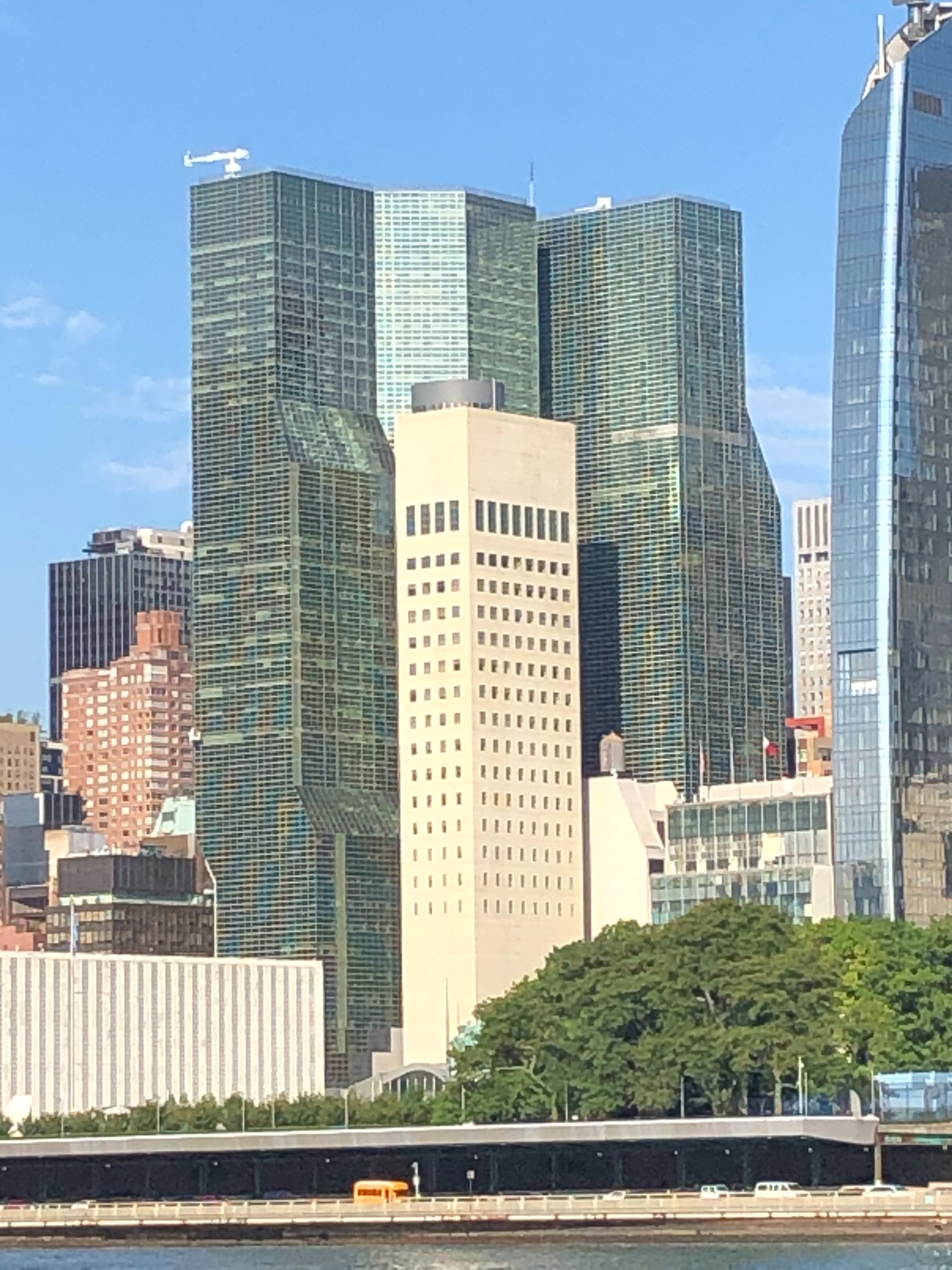
One UN Plaza (l) viewed west-southwest by 58th St.

The pool and health facilities are in the hotel portion. There is another slope where it adjoins the height of the US Mission to the UN, in order to align with, or recognize, the street line. At the southeast corner of the building, it is cut in to reflect the height of buildings across the street. The entire exterior is covered with a 3 X 5 foot grid of glass which "unifies the surface of the office building and the hotel and creates a very fine texture.

"As with a flavor in cooking, you put in a touch of something to create a familiar taste. That's the little flavor that stays with you and makes all the difference."

— Kevin Roche, 1985

New York City's zoning laws stated that if the northern face were all windows — as initially planned — they had to be 30 feet from its next-door neighbor, the United States Mission to the United Nations — up to the height of its facade. However, as the plan evolved, only 50 percent of the facade had functioning windows, placing it conveniently in a different zoning category. Therefore, the required setback was proportionally reduced to 15 feet. It has been logically assumed that Roche favorably used these zoning laws and rationalized the placing of the lower slant-back exactly at the point where the 15-foot rule no longer applied, "pitching the resultant plane up to that point where the 30-foot rule would have been" applied. Following this same logic, the higher 28th-floor slant-back is exactly at the point where the next setback rule would have been applied, "pitched to a point that marks the overall width of two typical hotel rooms plus a corridor, or roughly 60 feet".

"High Rise buildings tend to become minimalist sculptures because of their nature – tight, economical skin, the absence of scale, and enormous size. Sometimes it is possible to put color on the surface by expressing the floor levels or windows, or use it to change scale, all of which reinforce its form."

— Kevin Roche, 1985

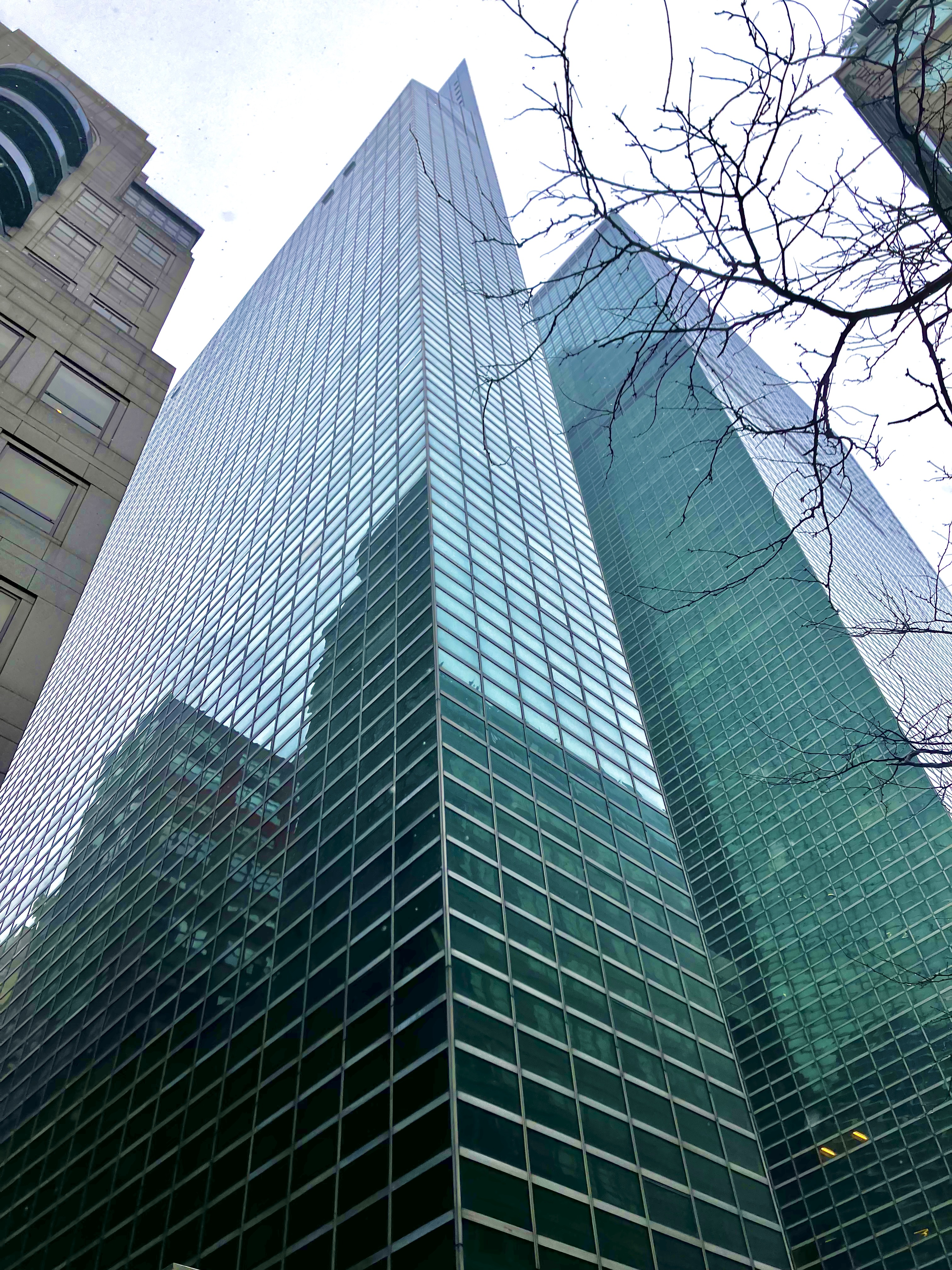
Two United Nations Plaza on the left, One United Nations Plaza on the right, viewed from James P. Grant Plaza across the street at Three United Nations Plaza (UNICEF)

The steel-frame structure is covered by an aluminum curtain wall with reflective glass. Although Mies van der Rohe first thought of an all‐glass skyscraper as early as 1921, it took a few more years for the glass curtain wall to evolve. Masonry continued to play a major role until after World War II, although glass had begun to make major inroads in such buildings as the Starrett–Lehigh Building on the block bounded by West 26th and 27th Streets and 11th and 12th Avenues in New York City. The first massive all-glass‐wall effect was first achieved in 1950 at the U. N. Secretariat. After the UN Secretariat, the second most influential glass curtain wall was the Seagram Building, designed in 1958 by Mies van der Rohe, Philip Johnson and Kahn & Jacobs, which "ushered in amber and bronzed monoliths, and its elegant, muted approach is still copied here and around the world". Initially, Roche considered the glass facade to be a polychrome glass with alternating primary colors, red and blue. Later, he chose an absolutely uniform surface, the color of which emphasizes the building's geometric changes in setbacks. When Roche asked the UN Secretary General for his opinion on the choice of red and blue, he was "unhappy with the idea". Roche then related it closer to the UN Secretariat glass color, which is green. According to Roche, this was his "minimalistic expression of the building's design, by using a uniform, small-textured skin to create a sculptured form, and by using reflective surfaces to delineate the form: dark, medium, light. When asked about deviating from the traditional and his design's modern look, Roche insisted that "any building is still crafted from traditional methods and is the same, whether it is traditional or modern." Plaza One has a glass skin with some solid wall behind it. Roche Dinkeloo had already opened a "new chapter as they pioneered the use of reflective glass in Bell Telephone's Development Center in Holmdel, N.J., in 1962." Lefer has suggested that "freedom in the use of glass enabled architects to design impressive structures, and that people prefer to live and work In buildings that have windows. The glass used by Roche-Dinkeloo is the third generation in reflective glass, which has a mirror-like coating on the glass to bounce back some of the sun's rays and heat, but is thin enough to see through from the inside. At night, one can see into a lighted space from the outside, but one cannot see out.

"It is not all transparent from the inside. It is glass used as a building material which is not necessarily transparent. Some of it is transparent, but glass is used over the solid parts because it is a very hard, impervious material which could last forever." There are four rows of windows for each floor and because the smaller‐than‐normal windows are uniformly distributed without protruding mullions, the effect is of a flat texture." "Stretched taut like a well‐fitted glove, the glass facade carries over the new building's stepped‐out and stepped‐back planes. Kevin Roche and John Dinkeloo (KRJDA) attempted to recreate the "Crystal Palace" look and succeeded, as they pursued the greenhouse look. Subsequently, manufacturers developed new types of glass. Nathan Silver of Harper's may have said it best: "Perhaps the architects remembered Steinberg cartoons (cartoonist for The New Yorker) of buildings made from graph paper and thought, there is a realism here, we ought to do this-to design the most flat, repetitious, scaleless (four layers of grid per floor level confuse the eye), paperlike (the colored and partly silvered glass appears opaque) skin yet... Its designers see themselves as artists, not idea men."

1 UN Plaza view southwest, and west

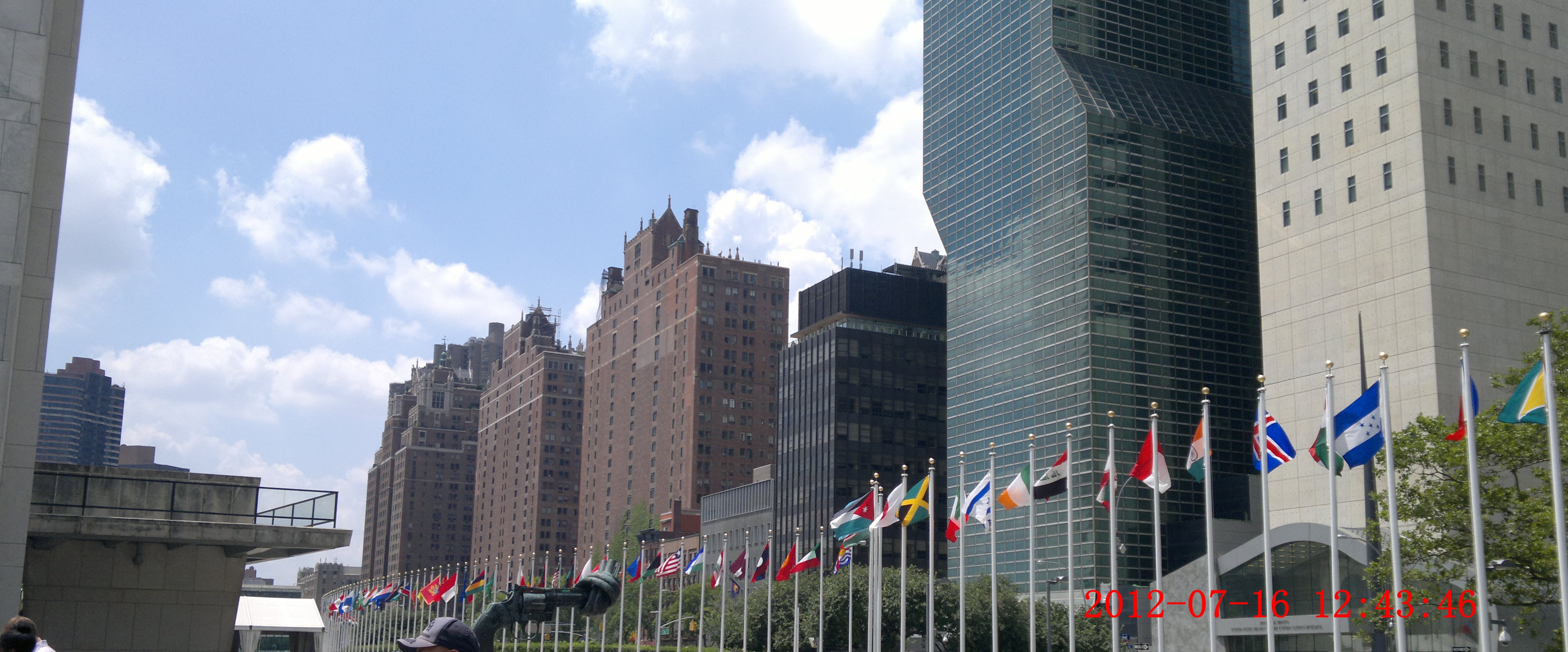
One UN Plaza's chamfer seen on the southeast corner, and the first of two northern setbacks — at the 12th floor — is visualised

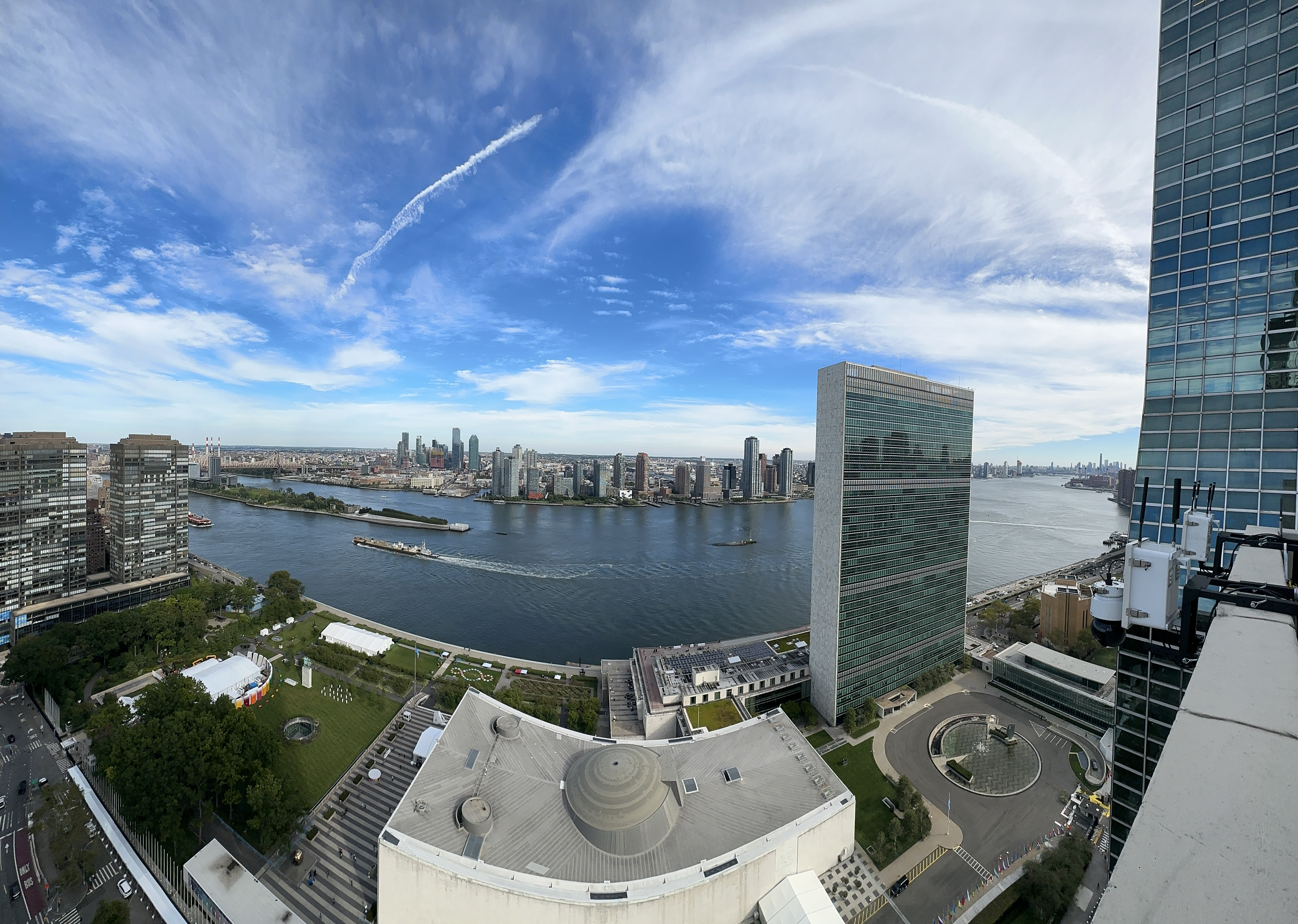
The 28th story setback seen from atop the US Missions to the UN Building next door, view northeast

These slant-backs, or lean-tos, on the northside face do so for approximately the eastern one-third of the building. The western two-thirds of the building juts out at approximately 45 degrees to increase its square footage for about a third of the total length of the northern face, then returns parallel to conform to the southern face's configuration. On the northern side of the building, the upper stories were made to indent, as already mentioned. These two "atypical" setbacks or "slantbacks" sheathed in glass are laid at 45-degree angles. The setbacks are angled from the 12th floor and again, from the 28th floor up to 45 degrees. The slantbacks form a "lean-to" or "shed-like" appearance so much that the building appears "continuously wrapped" or flowing in aluminum and glass. The setbacks are placed above the office stories which have a larger floor area. The third setback, on the southeast corner of the building, is architecturally opposite to the northern face's slant back: a "slant-out" or chamfer. The slant-out angles up to the 12th floor, below which the corner of the building appears to have been sliced off.

One UN Plaza view northwest, from the southeast

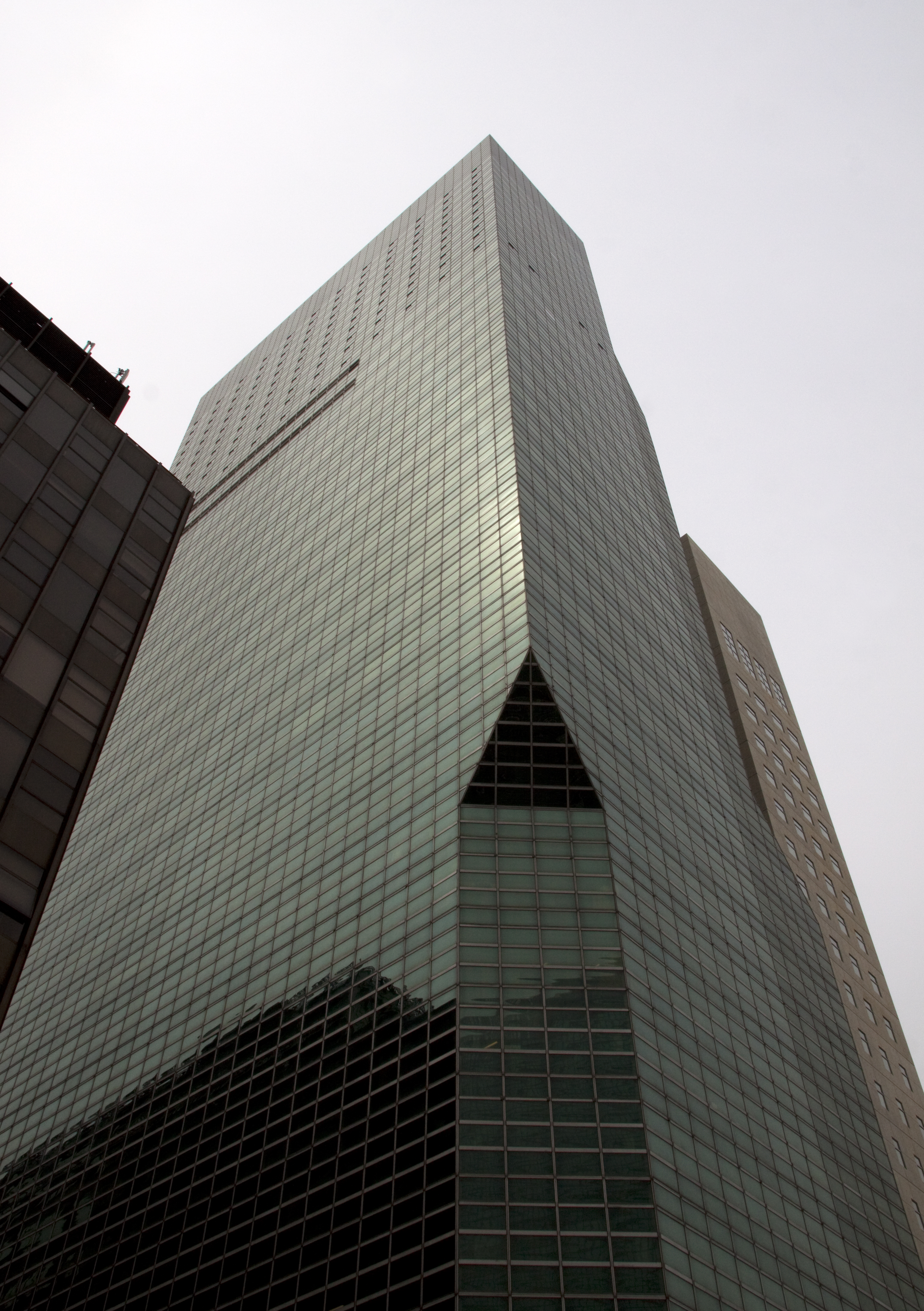
The southeast corner of One UN Plaza

Also, it is no coincidence that the slant-out occurs at exactly the same height as the Church Center for the UN: the 12-story building directly across the street on 44th Street. Roche's attention to the building's surroundings rationalized the logical aesthetic look to "deflect one's attention across 44th Street and to the visual panoply of the UN" as one drives north up the UN Plaza street or walks south (note: UN Plaza is a one-way street, running only northbound, as First Avenue was diverted underground and parallels the UN Plaza street to reduce traffic). The building is skirted by a second-story facade that slopes outward, thus creating a canopy above the ground floor. By accommodating the specific zoning laws of New York City, the result was an instant success.

"Svelte of build and spiffily draped in a toga of reflective blue-green glass, the 39-story One United Nations Plaza ... is a friendly neighborhood skyscraper which, leaving a lot to the imagination, has a lot going on inside its 586,000-square-foot bulk," according to William Marlin. The Roche-Dinkeloo architects designed One as an architectural complement to the UN Secretariat Building, situated diagonally across the street on First Avenue of the typical "postmodernist" design. It is basically the same height as the UN Secretariat — minus three feet. One's 505 ft (154 m) height could not be taller according to New York City's zoning laws. Therefore, visually and architecturally it was designed with the same visual enthusiasm as the Secretariat Building and became an aesthetic complement to rival the equally-impressive UN headquarters. With its glass and aluminum facade similar to its grand neighbor, albeit with some differences discussed below, One UN Plaza became hugely popular. "[The building] is an intelligent counterpoint to the U.N.'s Secretariat Building — the color ... the materials, and the odd shape ... provides an interesting rhythm to play against the Secretariat's even slab." Silver states regarding the setbacks: "KRJDA's intentions are beyond the merely anecdotal. This is revealed in other interesting aspects. The glass and metal wall is folded like paper, forming a few angular prisms horizontally and vertically on the exterior and making it geometrically different from anything nearby in the cityscape."

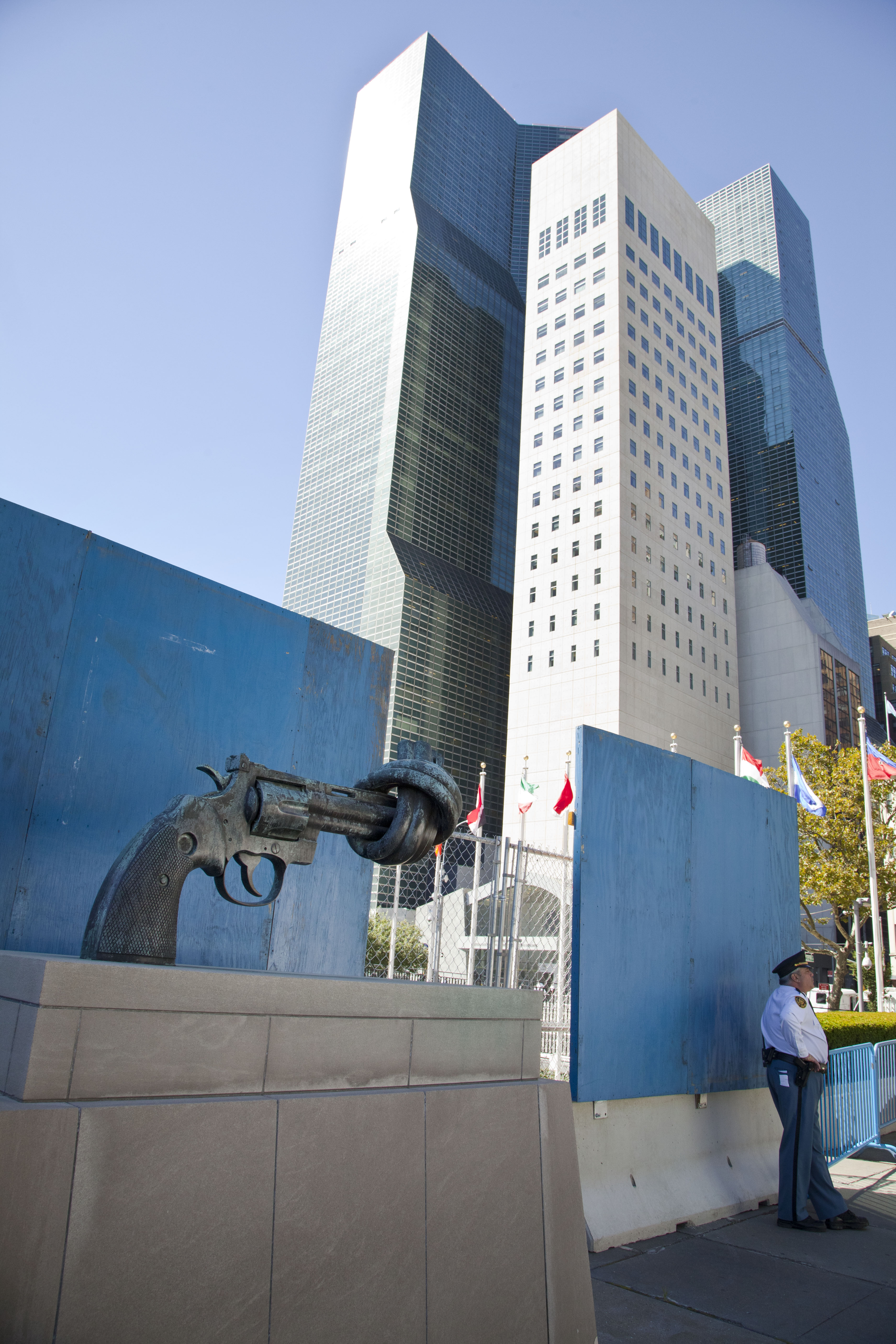
One (left with northside setbacks) and Two (right with western setback) United Nation Plaza buildings viewed from across the street at the UN (the US Mission to the UN between both)

A surprising outcome of this unique building design was the construction cost: $32 million. A device they resorted to is the "simple old trade-off; cut corners where they don't show, and save the quality materials for visual impact." Construction costs were kept down by staying up with the materials market to know when and where to buy steel— by using the Wall Street Journal. As a result, Roche-Dinkeloo was able to pre-purchase steel at that time, for the "unheard of" price of $485 per ton, even though the steel arrived before the money did from the UNDC. Initially, One UN Plaza housed the hotel, the offices of the United Nations Development Program, the liaison offices for the International Monetary Fund, and the Food and Agriculture Organization. It was financed by a $55.2 million bond issue in 1973.

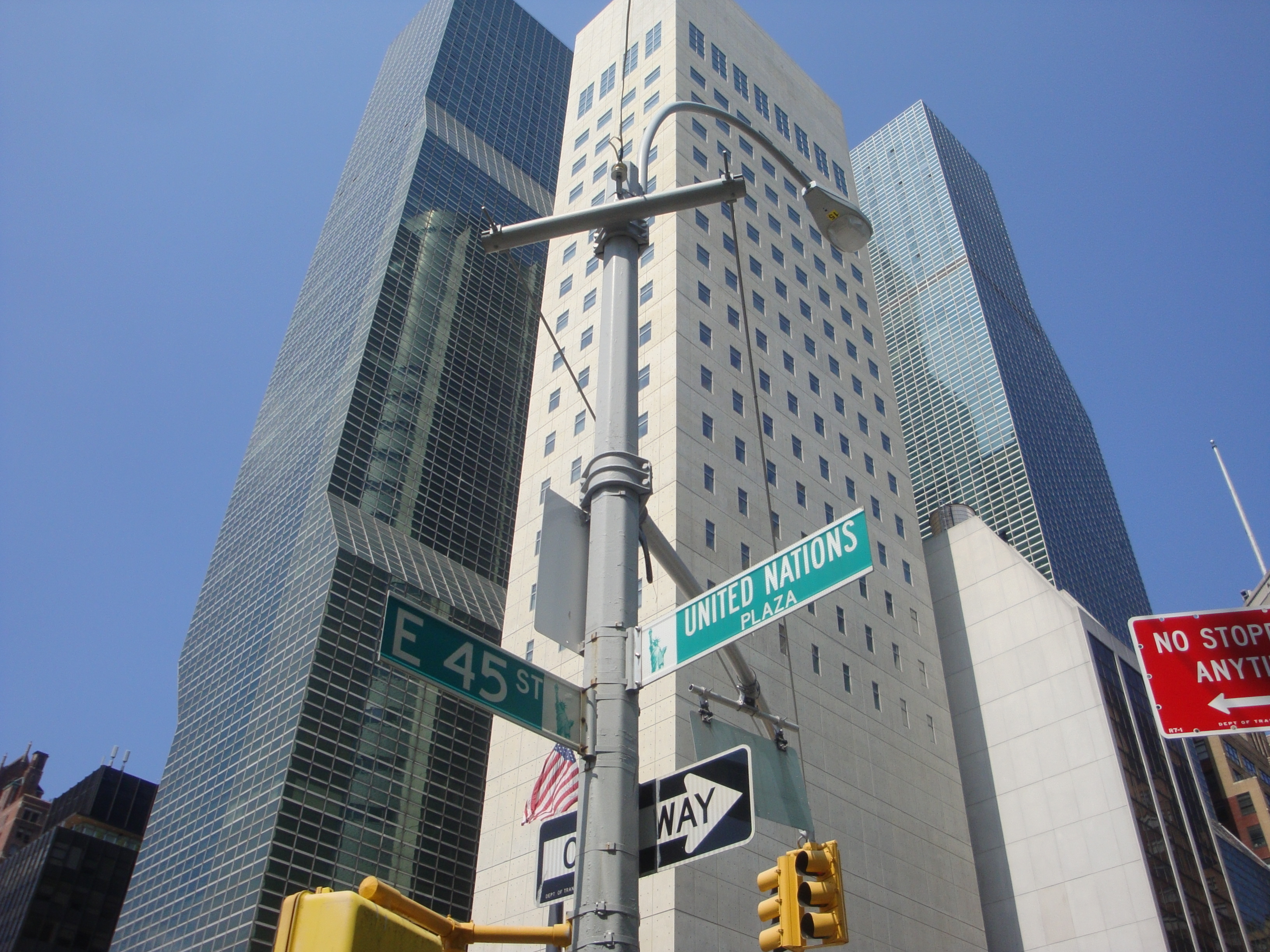
One UN Plaza's southeast corner chamfer (lower left corner of photo), identifying the 12th floor level. The two northern face setbacks seen on the opposite side of the building, identifying the 12th and 28th floors.

Roche-Dinkeloo used a glass curtain wall made of blue-green glass. This blue-green glass curtain wall was "griddled in a pattern that denied any sense of the building's true scale." There are 4'7"-by-2' 71/2" rectangles of reflective double-glazed windows and panels similar to those of the sheathing used at the Lehman Pavilion of the Met Fifth Avenue. These metallized double-glazed green-tinted panels are laid horizontally, and are not related to the floor space behind them, but divide the typical vertical unit into four equally sized panels. The glass panels give off a bluish cast that wrap around the steel frame of One United Nations Plaza. "The glass covers everything like a great shining blanket, and its pattern offers no hint as to the goings‐on inside," according to Goldberger. The arrangement of the windows differed depending where you were, either on the upper or lower stories. A skirt of flowing glass produces an overhand surrounding the entire building's sidewalks of similar-sized and similar-appearing blue-green glass, or porte-cochere.

=== Interior features ===
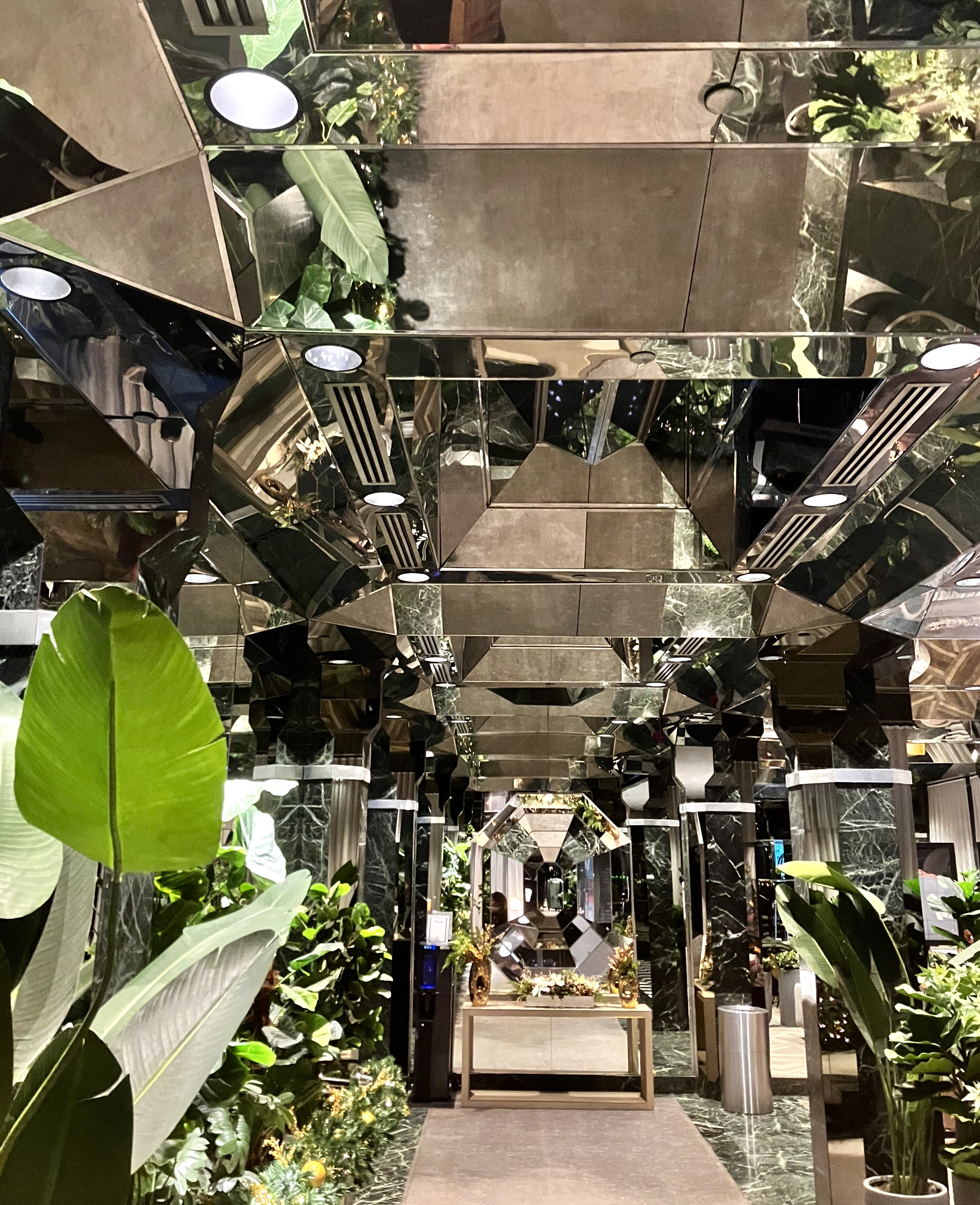
Millennium Hilton Hotel in One United Nations Plaza, New York City

Kevin Roche was put in charge of One's interior design, which was not the usual practice of interior decorating for buildings. Most of the office styles were usual and typical for offices at the time. As for the interior designing, Roche was anything but typical. He made use of metal and mirrors to enhance or increase the visualised spaces. "Roche made every attempt to explode the space beyond its confines." In the lobbies, Roche placed a hung ceiling which consisted of Plexiglass below and reflective metal above, making it difficult to find the actual ceiling.

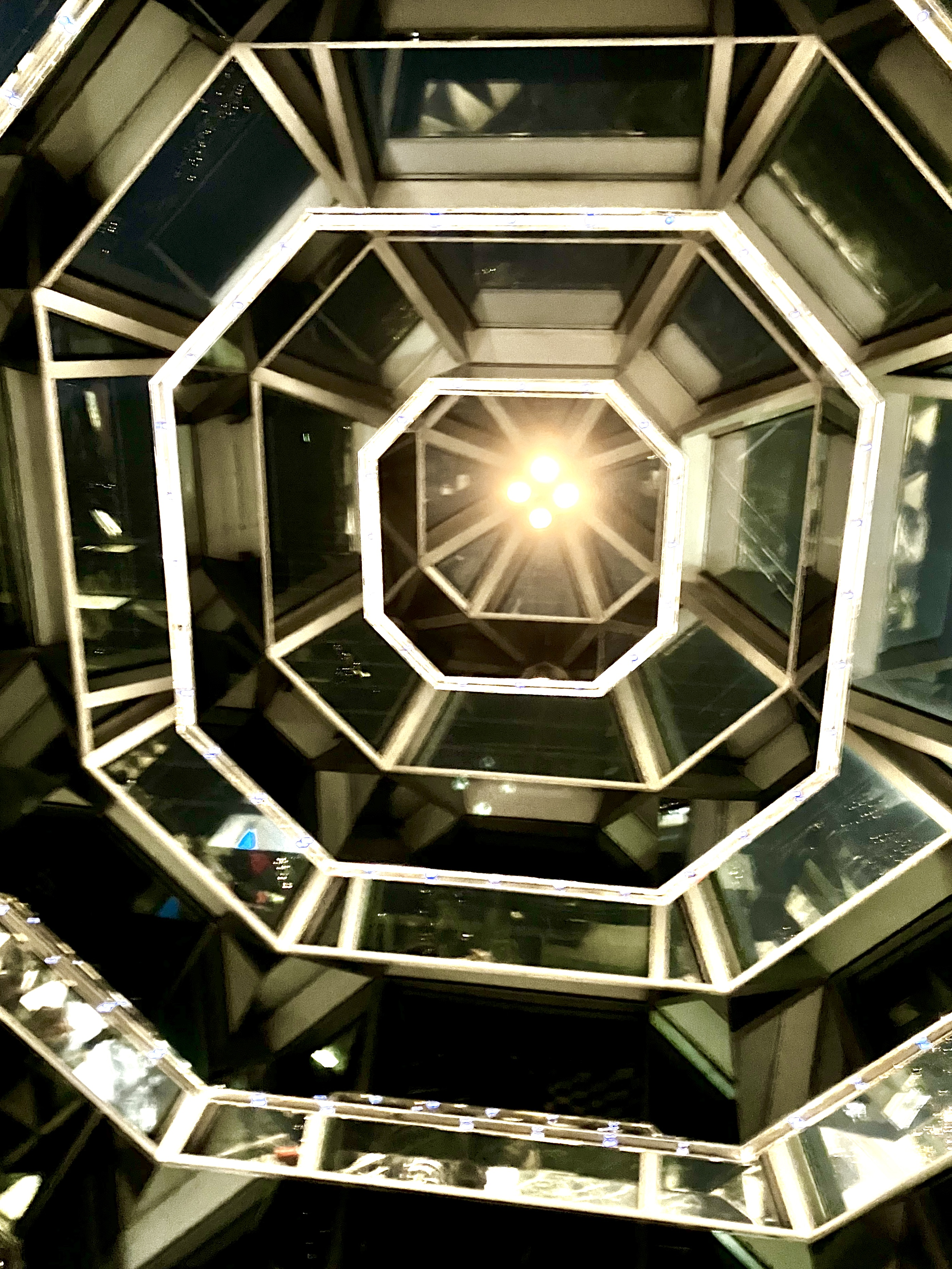
Mirrored—vaulted ceilings in the lobby of the Millennium Hilton Hotel, One United Nations Plaza

Using other reflective materials like polished marble and stainless steel "added to the delerium." His desired kaleidoscopic outcome, always changing, was achieved.

==== Opening ceremony ====
On opening day, what had begun under Mayor John Lindsay was finally completed under the tenure of Mayor Abraham Beame. The opening ceremony dedicating One United Nations Plaza on November 20, 1975, was attended by a group from New York City's political landscape that included Mayor Abraham Beame; the United States Ambassador to the United Nations, Daniel Patrick Moynihan; the Secretary General of the United Nations, Kurt Waldheim; and the chairman of the UNDC, John J. McCloy. When the building first opened, the hotel lobby was entered directly off of 44th Street, while the office lobby was put into place by Roche. An interesting key security feature of the hotel was the ability to enter the hotel or lobby not only from the main floor, from Forty-fourth Street, but from a through-block driveway. Both the lobby and the driveway were specifically designed for such a purpose. A dignitary or UN official could enter without being seen publicly or from any heightened security need, should it arise.

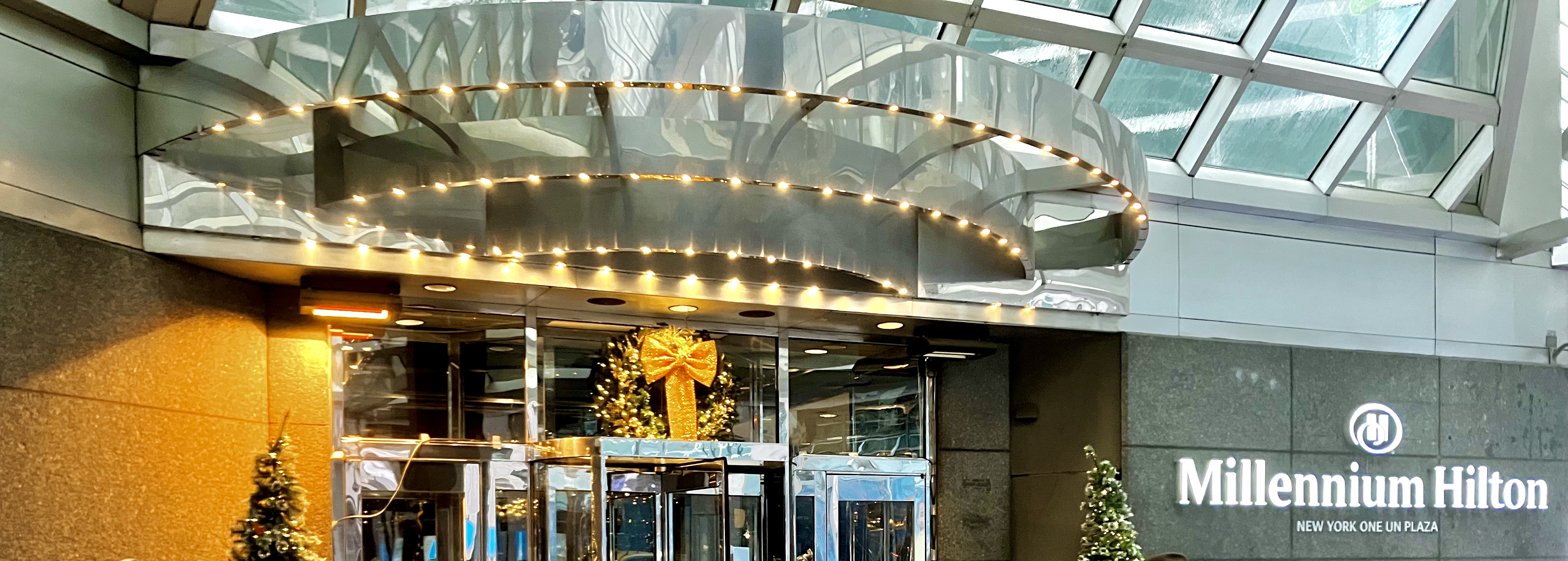
Entrance of Millennium Hilton Hotel One and Two United Nations Plaza, with lit overhead archway above doors, Christmas, 2024.

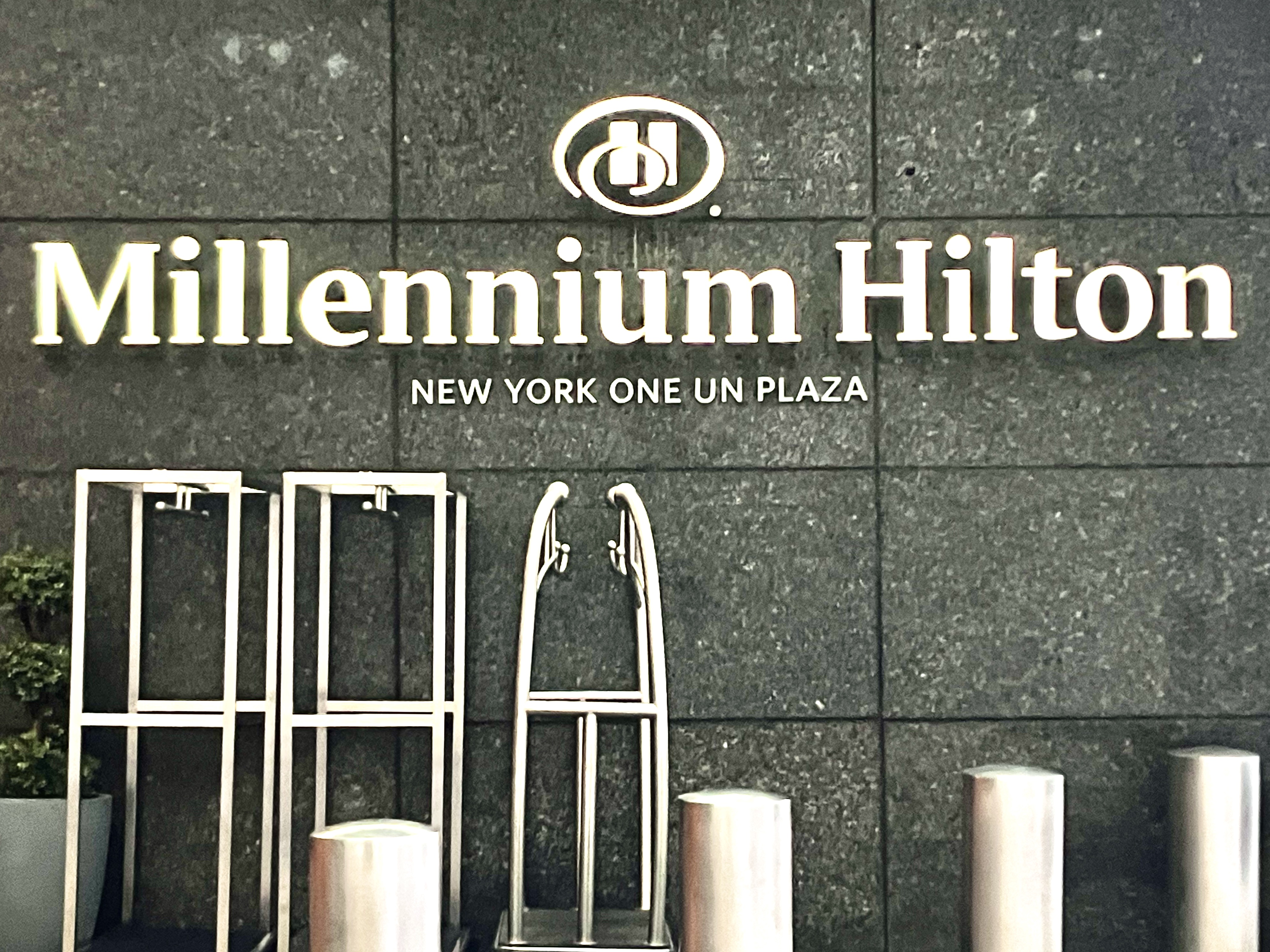
Logo of Millennium Hilton Entrance on the wall of One United Nations Plaza.

=== Offices and hotel ===
The first 26 floors, located on the northwest corner of 44th Street next to the United States Mission to the United Nations, has offices for the United Nations and for its delegations. The top 13 floors were the hotel, with 292 rooms and suites; a swimming pool with an overhead Oriental canopy, and gymnasium on the 27th floor; an air‐conditioned tennis court on the top floor. It was initially operated by Hyatt International Hotels. Hyatt Hotels stated that the hotel would be available by priority to heads of state, dignitaries, representatives of foreign governments and others participating in programs related to the United Nations, and followed by the public, according to the UNDC. Although the hotel did not open on the building's opening day, One United Nations Plaza's offices were ready for occupancy, while the hotel was slated to open the following year. United Nations personnel were informed to move into the glass tower two weeks after the grand opening. The hotel underwent a name-change to the "United Nations Plaza Hotel", and was scheduled for opening in March 1976.

== Gallery ==
Millennium Hilton Hotel

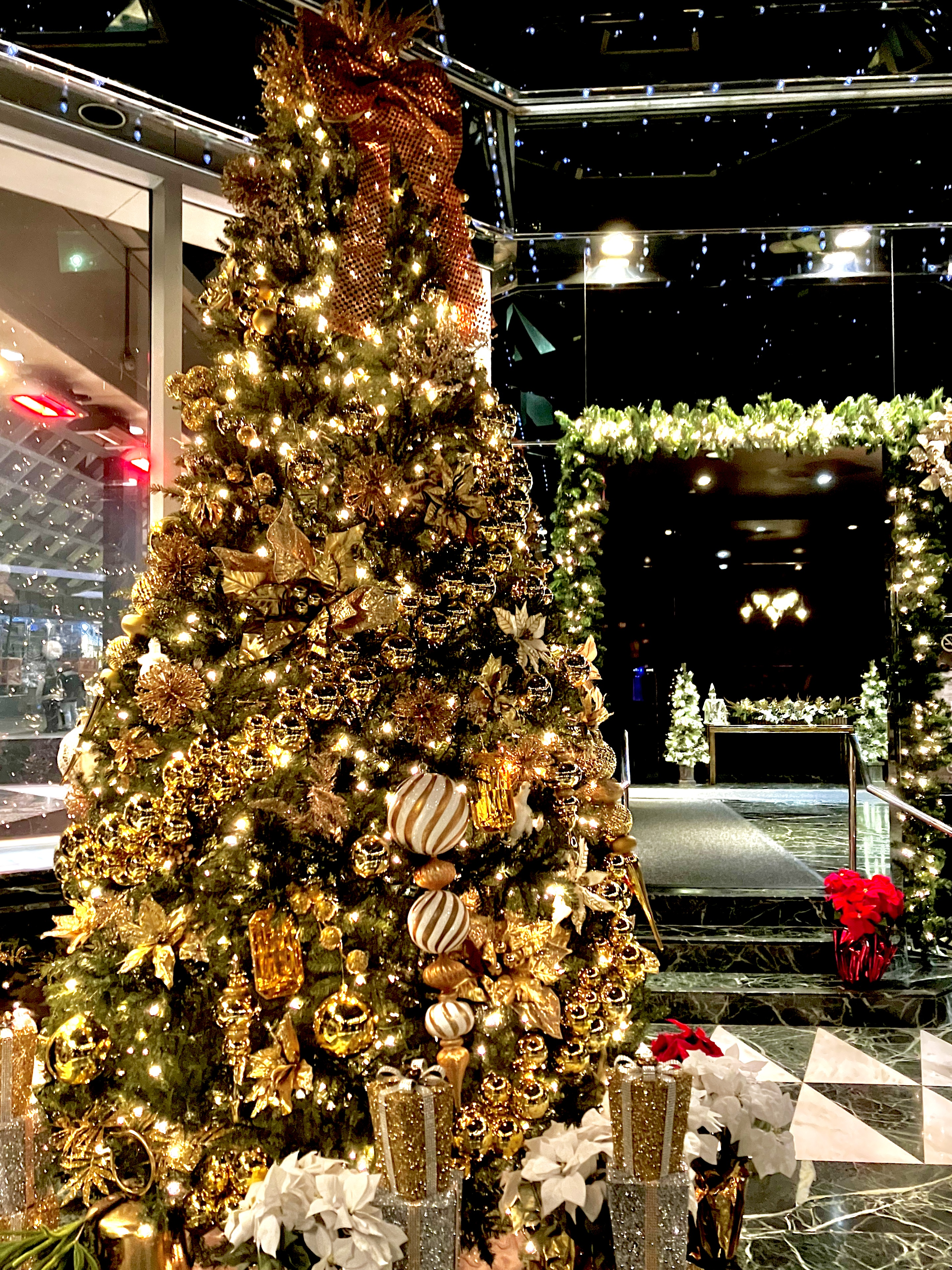
Lobby of Millennium Hilton Hotel of One and Two United Nations Plaza, Christmas, 2024

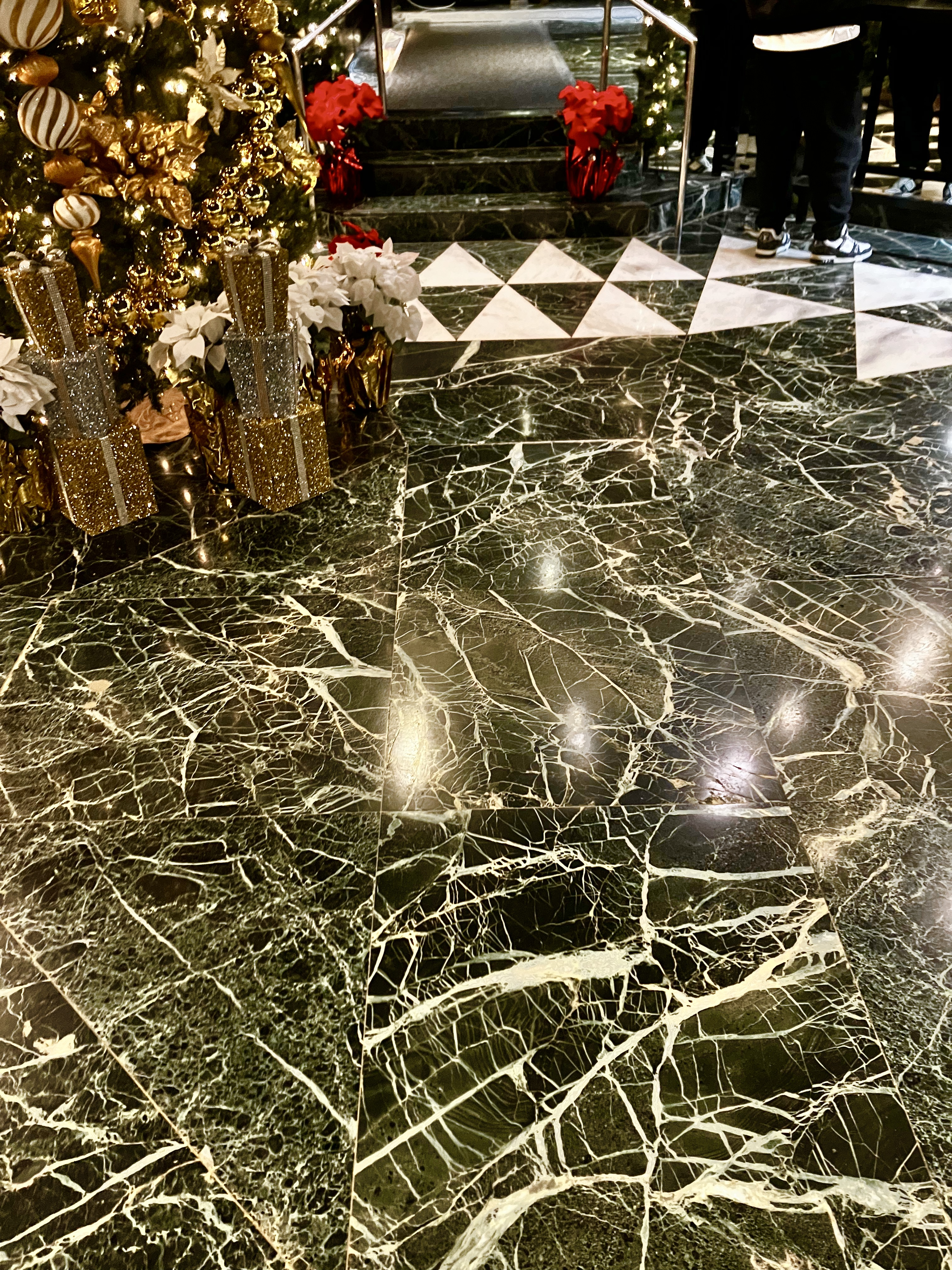
Green-marbled foyers in the lobby of the Millennium Hilton Hotel at One and Two United Nations Plaza, Christmas, 2024

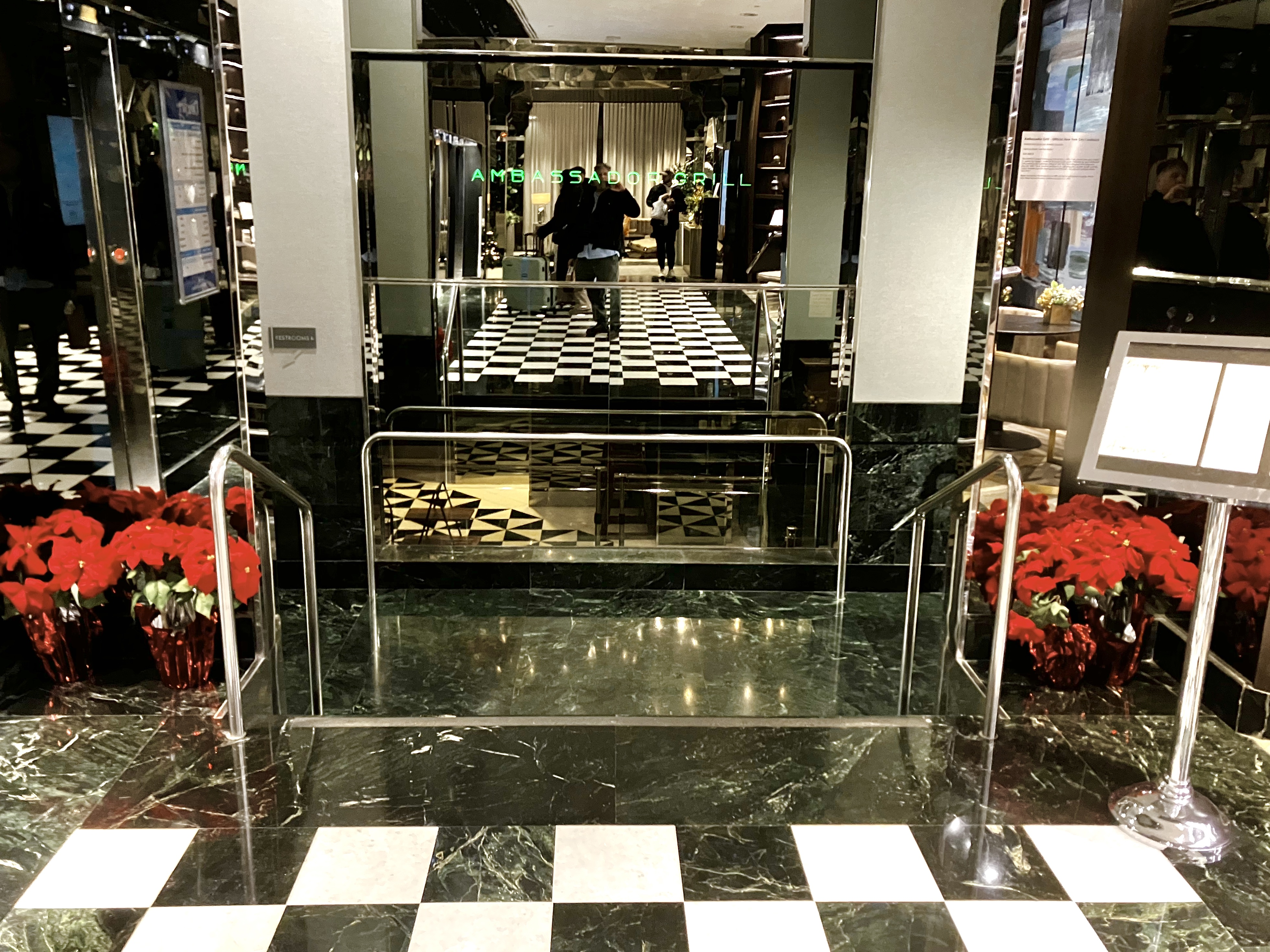
Entranceway downstairs one level to the Ambassador Grill and Ambassador Lounge, Millennium Hilton Hotel One UN Plaza

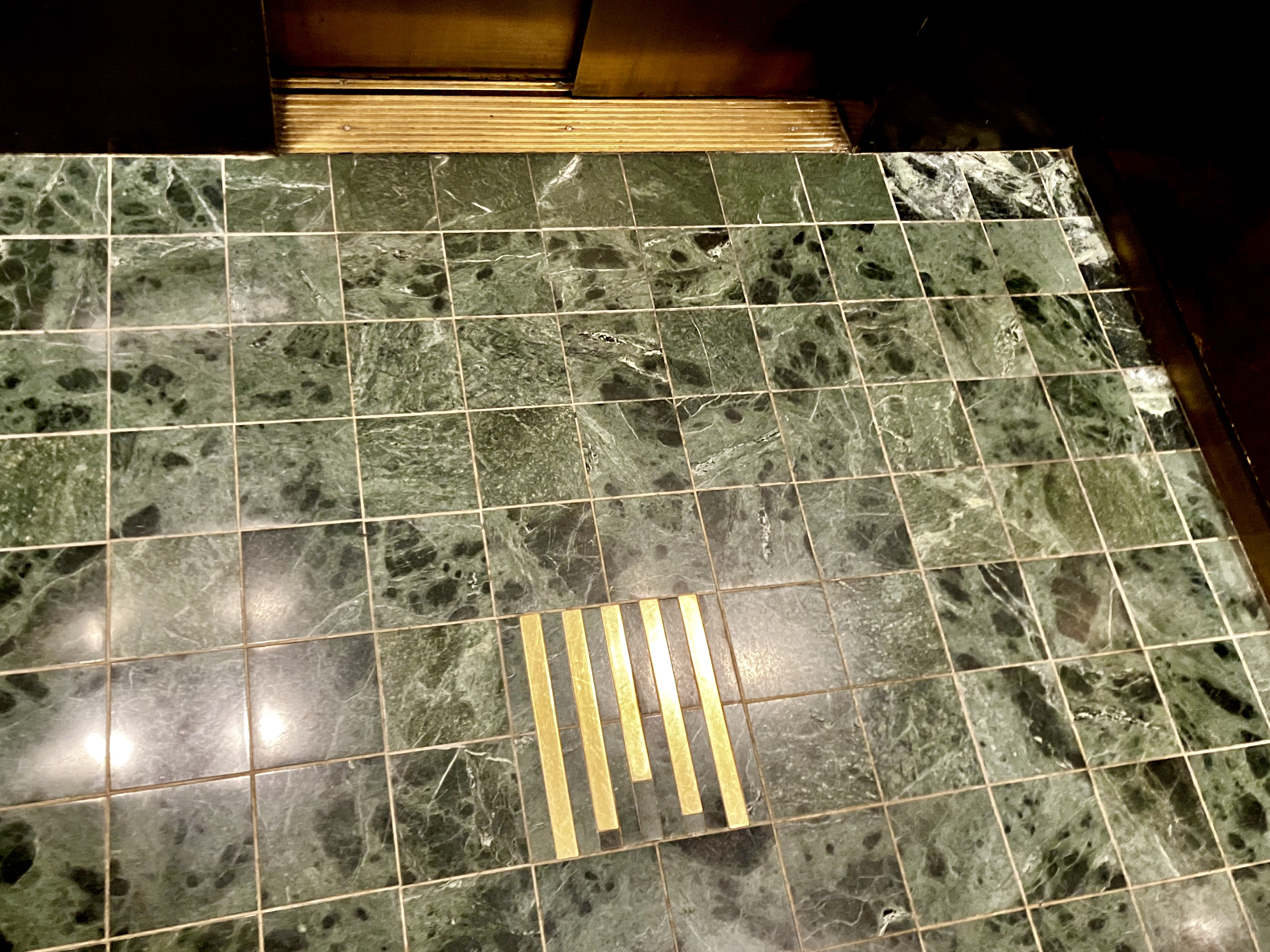
Elevators of Millennium Hilton Hotel — One United Nations Plaza carrying same motif of dark green-marbled floors and inlaid brass as in lobby

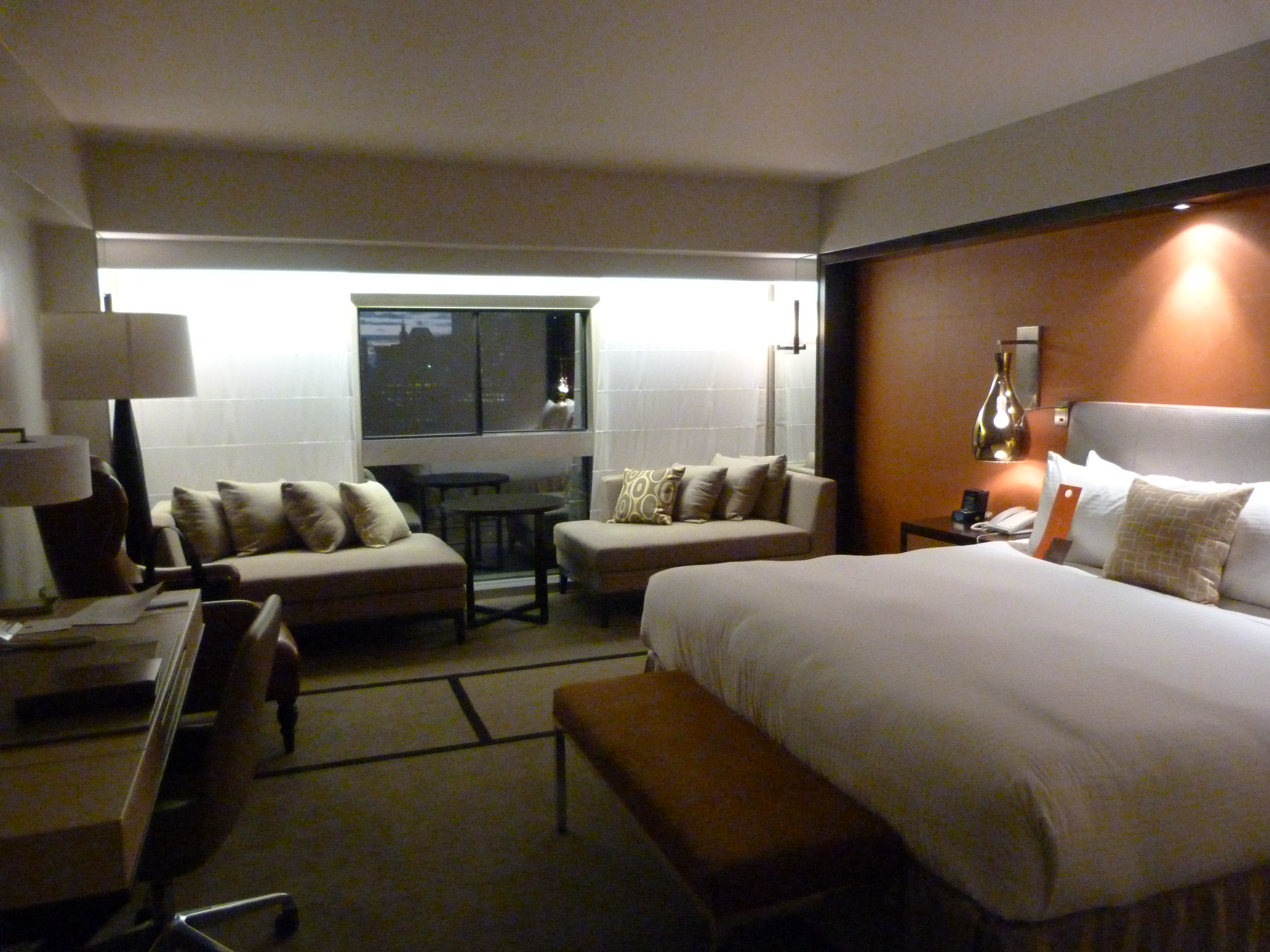
Room on 37th floor at One UN Millennium Hilton Hotel.

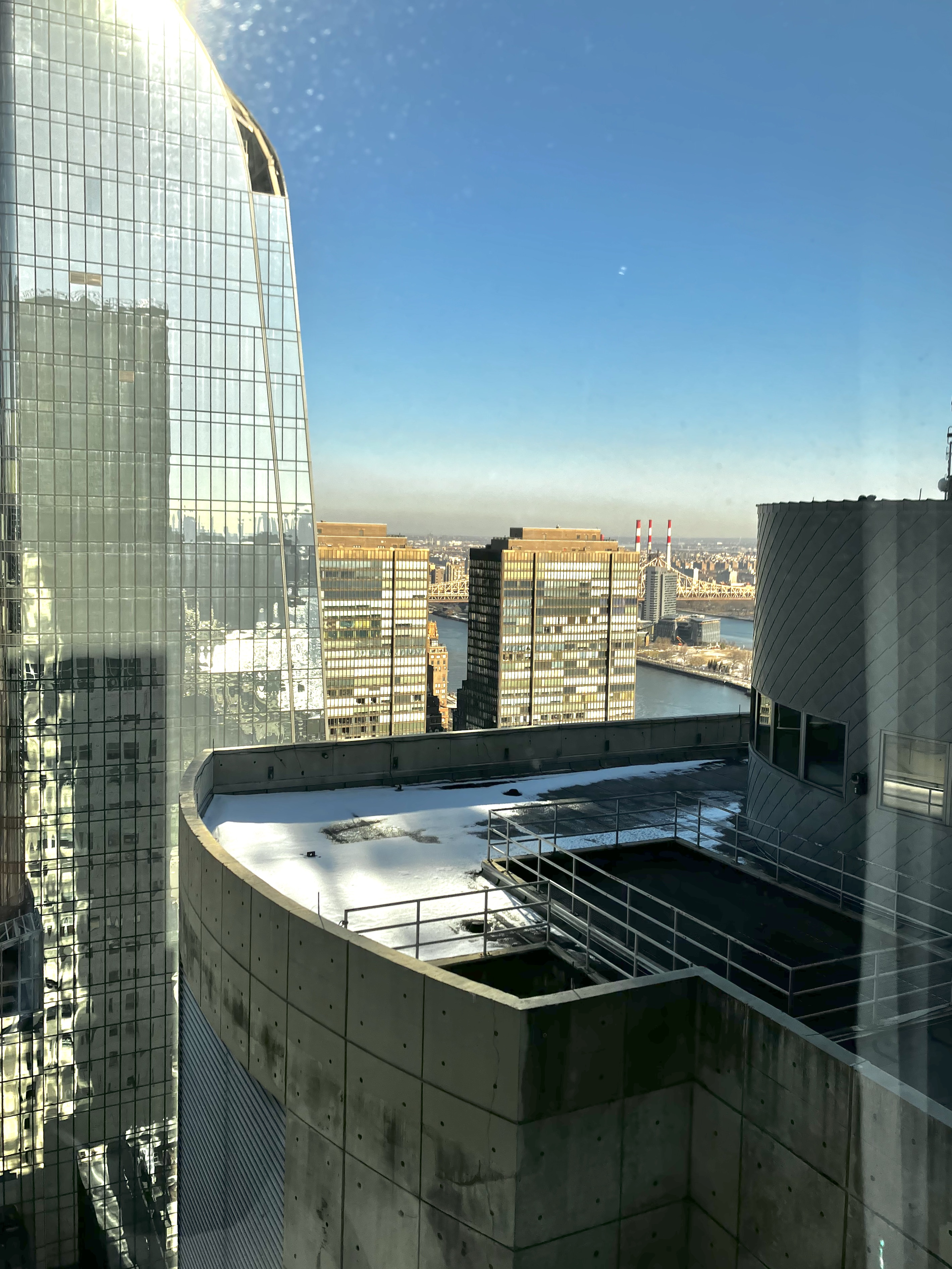
View northside from 29th floor of Millennium Hilton Hotel at One United Nations Plaza. Viewing roof of the US Mission to the UN, with Roosevelt Island and the East River.

The floors of the small hotel lobby were made of Italian greenish-black marble that continued up the wall as wainscoting where it met a chrome rail. Within the chrome rail was hidden indirect lighting, which eliminated the need for tables and lamps, and which shone "iridescently." Above the chrome rail was a velvet-textured fabric on the wall panels. Down the corridor was a black‐and‐white marble checkerboard floor that flanked a simple reception desk and elevator bank. This similar design continued to the upstairs corridors and rooms in typical modernism style. Down the corridor and up a few stairs was the Ambassador Grill and Restaurant.

== Gallery ==
Ambassador Grill and Lounge

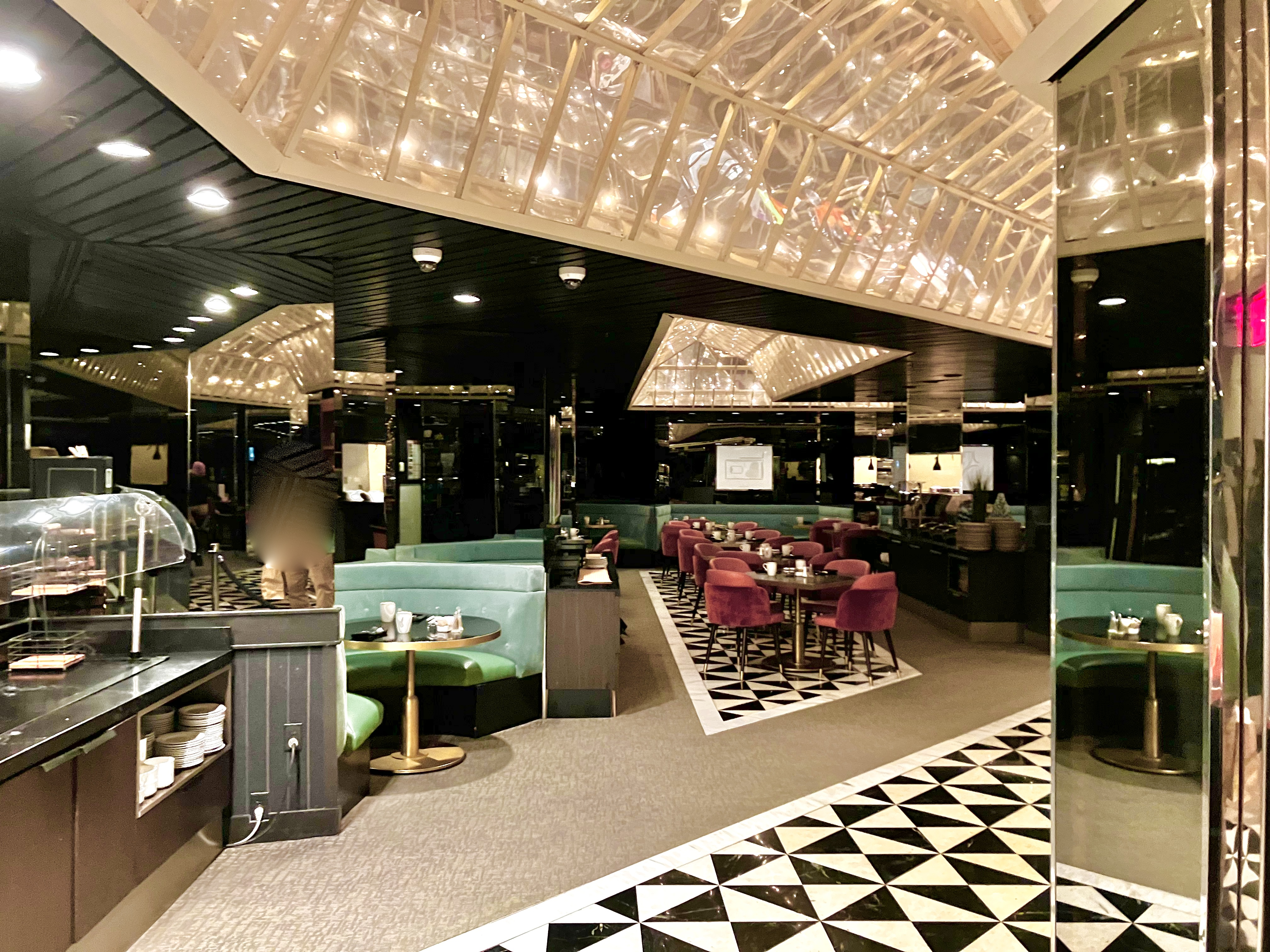
Ambassador Grill in the Millennium Hilton Hotel, One United Nations Plaza.

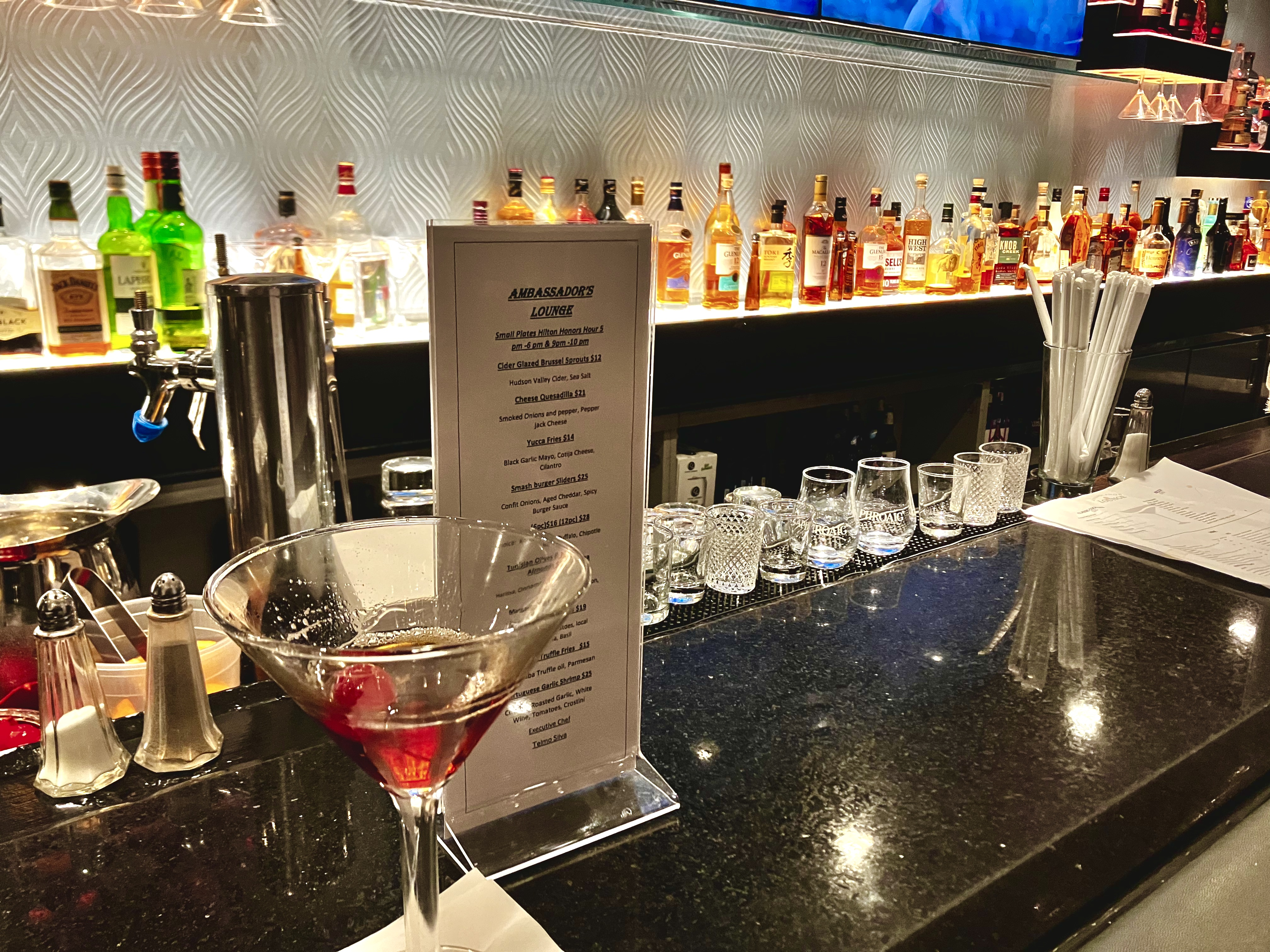
Ambassador Lounge in the Millennium Hilton Hotel.

The combined structural and decorative columns in the hotel were four-sided and mirrored on all sides. In contrast, the columns in Two United Nations Plaza are eight-sided.

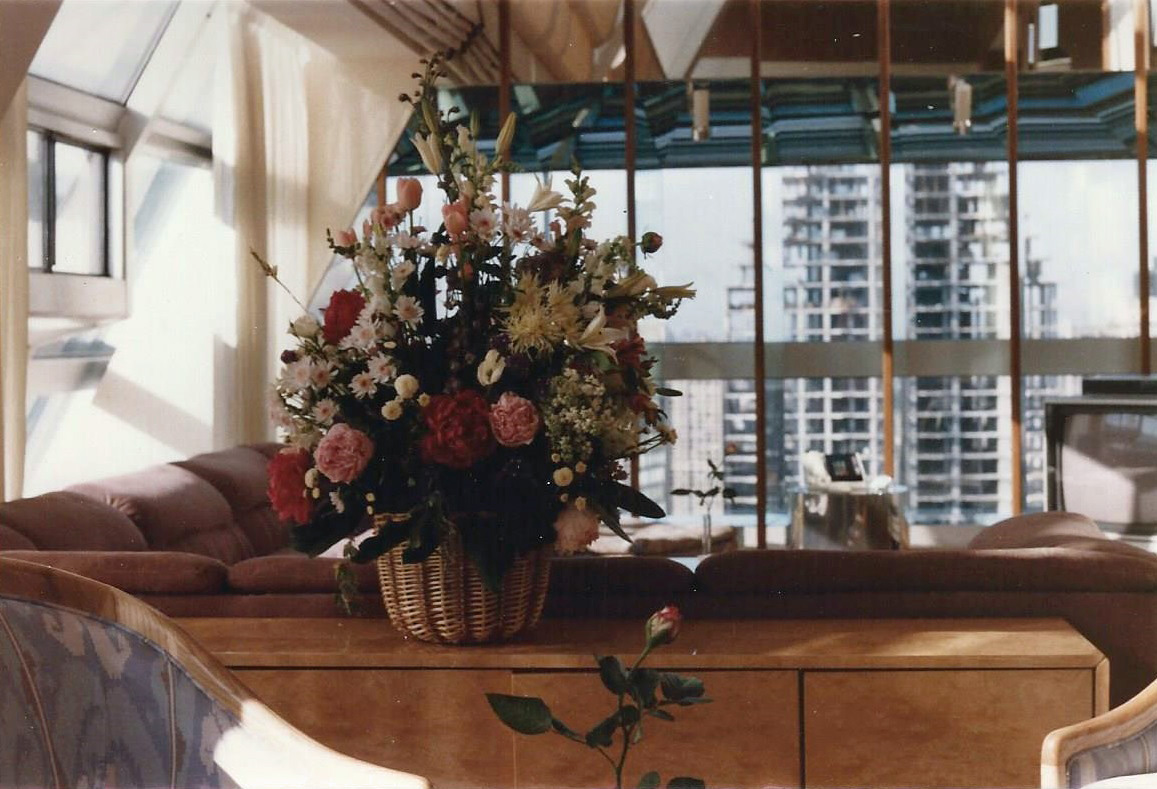
The northwest corner of the Javier Pérez de Cuéllar Suite

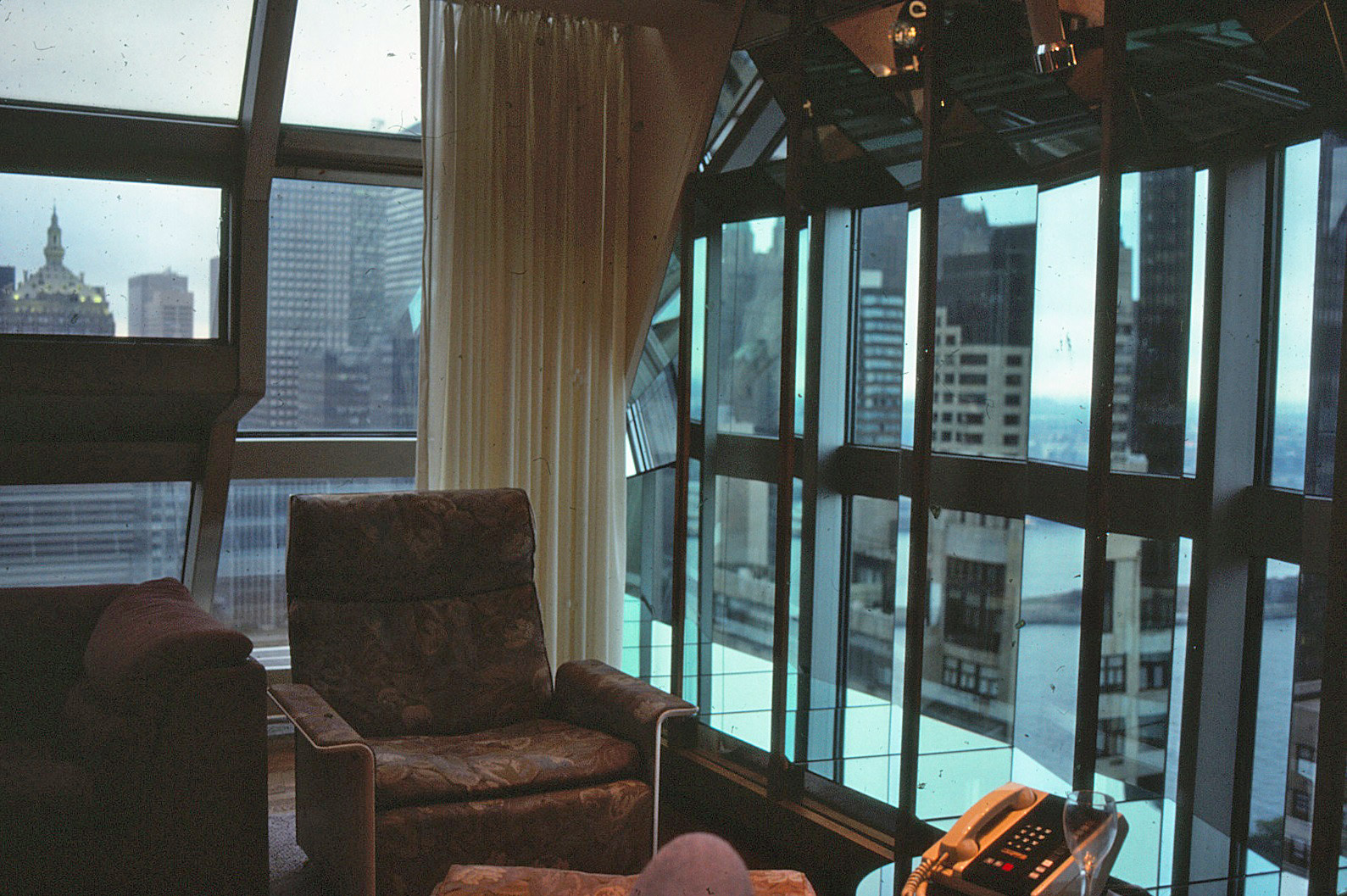
The northeast corner of the Javier Pérez de Cuéllar Suite with partial view of Roosevelt Island

The hotel's rooms were not large except for the suites. Most of the suites are duplexes with spiral staircases and share the "shed" or "slant-back section of the curtain wall. As a result, the suites are the few parts of One UN Plaza that express the building's exterior into the rooms, besides the 27th‐floor canopied swimming pool, walled-in by glass and an expansive view of New York City and the East River. The hotel offers a ground-floor restaurant bar, seating 125, 5,000 sq. ft. of retail rental space, canopy-covered sidewalks, and an enclosed bridge reaching across a street to the permanent U.N. headquarters. The planned sister building, a 580,000-sq. ft. building occupying an 18,900-sq. ft. site was slated to be finished in 1975. Both strengthen the physical links to the existing movement patterns of the U.N. district, while stepped-back and stepped-out glass facades portray a super-scaled complex.

== History of Turtle Bay ==
Turtle Bay was referred to as Turtle Bay Farm by early settlers. The farm was adjacent to the East River and by the mid-eighteenth century, Turtle Bay Farm extended from about 40th to 49th Street and from Third Avenue to the East River. The farm was named after a cove in Turtle Bay. The cove was given its name from the abundance of turtles in the slow-moving brackish water found along the East River. The cove was located off the East River from about 45th to 48th Streets. Turtle Cove was fed by a small stream that originated at approximately Second Avenue and 48th Street. There was such an abundance of turtles in the cove that residents held a "turtle feast.". Filled in for development purposes, the cove is now covered by the gardens of the northern (northeastern half along the East River) border of the United Nations grounds. Eventually, Turtle Bay Farm was replaced by homes (along the northwestern half of Turtle Bay), riverfront industry, and shantytowns beginning from the mid-18th century. Historical records of the "Turtle Bay Gardens Historic District" which is a two-block area along the northwestern half of Turtle Bay (from East 48th to E. 49th Street, between Second and Third Avenues), describe the twenty homes that were built there. Notable people who have lived there include Katharine Hepburn (#244 E. 49th St.), Stephen Sondheim (#246 E. 49th St.), and Tyrone Power. However, these historical records also describe the not-so-notables of Turtle Bay. The outliers who lived there called it "Blood Alley", as the once pristine Turtle Bay Farm and Turtle Cove had become slaughterhouses for their proximity to the cove and river. After renovations in the 1920s, the area underwent a rapid building period, and the cove was filled in.

== Land acquisition ==
During the 1940s, a real estate developer named William Zeckendorf began actively buying properties in Turtle Bay to construct or develop Turtle Bay. However, Zeckendorf was unsure as to what type of development he would be allowed to build by New York City's Planning Commission or New York's City Council. For that reason, he coined the term, "X City" since he had no idea what to build. Both the Planning Commission and New York's City Council are the two powerful organizations that determine the future of building sites in New York City as part of New York's home-rule designation for municipalities. Both are required for a new building, which then needs approval from the at-the-time Board of Estimate, all as important as the mayor's approval, the governor of New York State and New York State's legislature. However, it wasn't until 1946 – after World War II – that a six-square city block and the slaughterhouse area were razed. The Third Avenue El train closed in 1955, which was the last of Manhattan's el trains, and the 16-acre area known as Turtle Bay or X City was destined to become the UN Plaza, headquartered at the UN Secretariat, its UN General Assembly and associated buildings.

John D. Rockefeller Jr. reached out to Zeckendorf. He proposed a lump sum cash offer of $8.5 million to Zeckendorf, who leaped at the opportunity. After a round of last-minute negotiations, Rockefeller then gifted it to the UN after "eleventh-hour negotiations" which enabled New York to win the bid over a consortium of local New York businessmen and the cities of Boston, Philadelphia, and San Francisco, who were all leading contenders for the UN site at that time. The bid — negotiated by Zeckendorf between the Rockefellers and Mayor William O'Dwyer of New York City — was won. The group of New York businessmen (including Zeckendorf), who once planned the Turtle Bay site for their "private development", lost after Rockefeller announced he would "give to the city of New York the land as a gift". Mayor O'Dwyer gratefully accepted the gift from the Rockefellers and New York City became the future home of the UN. The Ford Foundation followed and contributed $6.2 million for the Dag Hammarskjold Library to be built along the southern border of the proposed UN site, as well as $6.5 million for a school chartered by the UN. Thus, the "Turtle Bay" area of land — from 42nd to 46th Streets, from the East River to 2nd Avenue — was destined to become the "Capital of the World".

Zeckendorf would later develop Roosevelt Field Shopping Center in the center of Nassau County, which is today still the largest shopping mall on Long Island. The exit M2 off of the Meadowbrook State Parkway in East Garden City and Uniondale, Long Island continues as Zeckendorf Boulevard in his honor. The boulevard serves as the access point to the shopping mall from the parkway.

=== Development ===
==== 1960–1963 ====
An influx of new politicians was the driving force behind the UN expansion. Newly elected governor of New York, Nelson D. Rockefeller, ever fond of large architectural projects (the World Trade Center, 1966–71), was the lynchpin behind the Roche-designed UN mega-project for the UN's expansion. The project began to firmly take root when newly appointed Ford Foundation president McGeorge Bundy granted the UN a large sum of money that was matched by the Rockefeller Brothers Fund to establish the Fund for Area Planning and Development. The dream of Rockefeller and McGeorge Bundy was eventually realized, but in piece-meal fashion: One UN Plaza (1969–75), Two UN Plaza (1979–83), and Three UN Plaza/UNICEF Hqtrs. (1983–87). All are located between 44th and 46th Streets, and First and Second Avenues.

==== 1963 ====
Beginning with Wallace Harrison of Harrison and Abramovitz (the chief architect for the UN Secretariat and General Assembly), who had envisioned luxury apartments for the nearby UN's Secretariat, foresaw twin towers at the north end of Zeckendorf's "X" City. He proposed this in 1946, and which was later built. This development became known as 860–870 United Nations Plaza, or simply the UN Plaza. This 2.3-acre area of X City became the nation's largest apartment-commercial office complex at that time. Senator Robert F. Kennedy lived in an apartment at UN Plaza. Due to advances in the anodizing of aluminum, the material's use rose exponentially and which was used in the building of 860–870 UN Plaza. This UN Plaza office/apartment complex used more aluminum sheathing than any other building in the world. It also became the most fashionable place to live in New York City. The need for another apartment/building complex rose. Bronze hard-coated aluminum had been used by Harrison and Abramovitz for the window frames, doors, and stair railings for the David Geffen Hall at Lincoln Center. In addition to the UN Plaza, the Japan House and Two Dag Hammarskjold Plaza were built with similar building requirements.

==== April 1966 ====
The future of the neighborhood surrounding the United Nations Secretariat Building and General Assembly was planned. U Thant, who was the Secretary General of the UN at that time, requested that a civic group be formed and to take charge of developing the land for the United Nations' use. This took place under the auspices of an organization initially known as the East River-Turtle Bay Fund, named for the area of land adjacent to both the East River and that section of Manhattan where the United Nations Secretariat Building in Turtle Bay. A few months later it was renamed the Fund for Area Planning and Development.

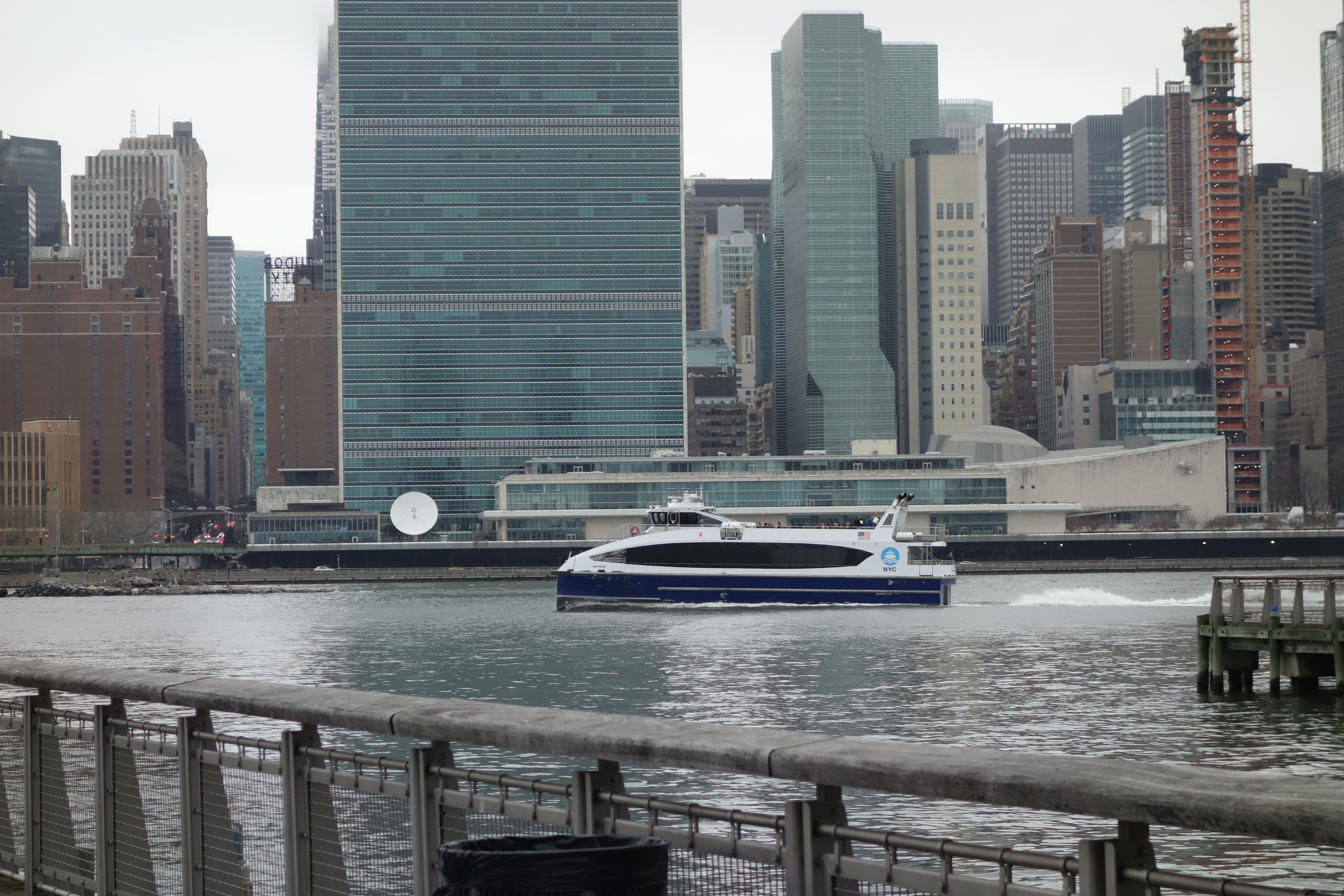
View of One and Two UN Plaza from across the East River from Gantry Plaza Park in Hunter's Point, Queens, NY. The UN Secretariat Building is on the left, one block south.

==== December 1966 — East River Turtle Bay Fund ====
After the UN Secretariat/General Assembly and the twin commercial/luxury apartments of UN Plaza had been built, it was up to the remainder of Turtle Bay's X City land to be developed. Secretary General U Thant requested the "drastic need" for office space which had been rented from nearby offices, and for a hotel, from the United Nations. He raised concerns that the United Nations Children's Fund and the United Nations Development Fund were severely affected by the shortage of office space and had been renting offices nearby. As a result, a cooperative agreement was formed in 1966, between the City of New York, the United States Government, and the United Nations. The linchpin was financial support from the Ford Foundation and the Rockefeller Brothers Fund, which became known as the East River-Turtle Bay Fund, Inc. It was established to specifically plan the land surrounding Turtle Bay and the United Nations to provide for: 1) office space; 2), a hotel and apartment complex for supporting the UN and its world-wide activities. The East River-Turtle Bay Fund was a combined civic and city cooperative organization that acted on behalf of the local Turtle Bay neighborhoods and of the United Nations. The fund was first headed by Schwarz, who was not new to this line of work. He had headed the building and planning commission for the Ford Foundation's headquarters building completed a year earlier. Since X City's land north of the UN had been already assigned for use, the fund's specific duty was charged with developing the three-acre area of land just south of the UN. The UN had deemed it ideal for extra office space and a UN hotel. The fund offered to pay for architectural and engineering expenses incurred. Recently elected New York mayor John Lindsey quickly endorsed the project.

A preliminary proposal planned for construction platforms to be built over the FDR Drive and the FDR's car exit at 42nd Street, as well as land which was then occupied by a seven-story Consolidated Edison-owned combined garage/office building at 708 First Avenue. This irregular, U-shaped 3-acre lot ran east from First Avenue to the East River, and south of 41st Street. The land was valued at that time between $12 million and $13 million. The parcel of land did not include Consolidated Edison's Waterside Generating Station south of 40th Street. Comparatively, the five-times larger (16 acres) parcel of land destined to become the United Nations Headquarters, just north of the proposed building/hotel/office-complex, was gifted to the UN twenty years earlier for $8.5 million (1946). The open end of the U-shaped lot faced west towards First Avenue, as it encompassed a large ventilation shaft for the Queens-Midtown Tunnel. Its massive size and fixed nature precluded any attempt of relocating the ventilation shaft and therefore any proposed building/hotel/office-complex would need to be built around it. Vehicular traffic was projected to pass below the office building/hotel complex built on massive platforms. This proposal would include parks, tennis courts, and pedestrian walks extending to the East River.

At first, the East River-Turtle Bay Fund could not commit to this grand scheme. At that point, other well-known New York endowments became players and initiated a spark for the proposal to be built. The Carnegie Foundation, the City Planning Commission of New York City, and the United States Mission to the United Nations joined the Rockefeller Brothers and Ford Foundations to ensure that the sale of Consolidated Edison's office building on the proposed site would go ahead. After hearing of the grand scheme on the U-shaped lot, U Thant's initial proposal for a 20-story office building at the northern end of the UN headquarters, where a row of Japanese trees existed, was tabled in favor of the proposal by the East River-Turtle Bay Fund of a building/hotel/office-complex on the U-shaped parcel of land just south of the UN's Headquarters. Although the exact site for the proposed building/hotel/office-complex was not chosen, projects like this one where buildings were constructed on platforms over existing structures had already been done in New York City. Robert Ashley, who was the secretary of the East River-Turtle Bay Fund, said that city permits required for such a grand undertaking were daunting, and the city had assured him that they would help in any way possible to expedite the proposed plan. Arthur Goldberg, the United States' ambassador to the UN, U Thant, and Mayor Lindsay had already stressed the need for such an undertaking.

==== April 1968 — first plan ====
A proposal was filed in 1968 in New York's capital, Albany, for a joint venture between New York City and New York State as overseers to the United Nations and the responsibility to that organization. Mayor John Lindsay of New York City and Governor Nelson D. Rockefeller of New York State jointly announced the plan for the UN expansion.

As Mayor Lindsay had explained, he believed the City of New York had an inherent responsibility as host city for the United Nations. At that time, the United Nations membership had increased from the original 55 members to 123 members, along with their associated organizations and tourists visiting the UN. To plan for this expansion, the East River-Turtle Bay Fund changed its name to the "Fund for Area Planning and Development, Inc.", a non-profit organization, and released a plan for the area to accommodate a proposed building/hotel/office complex. The fund was headed by Ralph Schwarz, who had overseen the building and planning for the Ford Foundation's headquarters, completed in 1967. Nine members constituted the Fund for Area Planning and Development, Inc., or simply the Fund for Area Planning and Development: two appointed by Governor Rockefeller; five by Mayor Lindsay; and two, the city's administrator for Housing and Development and the chairman for the city's Planning Commission as ex-officio members. Mayor Lindsay stressed that the corporation would be privately funded and that no New York bonds would be floated for the building project.

===== Turtle Bay study =====
Roche-Dinkeloo received the commission to design the UN expansion project. "Roche's thinking process, like that of a military strategist, is ultra-logical and goal-oriented." He began by stripping down the building to its bare essentials, and followed a formula that never failed him, approaching the problem as a kind of "situation, which in military parlance refers to the analysis and gathering of as much information as possible pertaining to decision-making. Roche researched the requirements set forth by the UN, and using his customary analysis, he estimated that by 1976 "the UN would need an additional 8,875 million square feet of space for staff, transient housing, as well as staff for related office use for member states and trade organizations." But this meant tearing down 6 million square feet of "existing urban fabric." Roche's first plan was unveiled in April 1968, to Mayor Lindsay and Governor Rockefeller in a slide presentation. There, Roche demonstrated his step-by-step idea of two large towers with a square footprint placed at forty-five degrees to the city's traditional grid, raised on a large platform housing a park, and on an axis perpendicular to the East River.

The basics included four major components: a linear public park by the East River, an office building, a hotel building, and a UN school. The hotel and office buildings would be "twins". Twin hotel/office buildings with a "monumental stairway" on Second Avenue at 44th Street, which would set aside most of the area from 43rd Street to 45th Street between First and Second Avenues, with a walkway connecting Hammarskjold Plaza at 47th Street. Roche said there would be a concourse running from 41st to 47th Street, thereby allowing pedestrians, even from Tudor City (just to the south, which will not be affected by the proposal) or tourists to walk the distance without crossing any street and alleviating the traffic congestion. The design, however, would close off Forty-Fourth Street and put First Avenue underground to make space for the gardens that would connect the new building to the UN Secretariat.

UN enclave proposal in April 1968. Proposed removal of 44th Street, depicting the two towers, a visitors' center, and the walkway across First Avenue to the UN Secretariat.

The grand plan proposed four sub-projects: a linear park along the East River, a United Nations office building, a mixed-use building with a hotel and an apartment complex for UN delegates, a UN-chartered school, and a visitor center. The plan would transform the neighborhood, from the mostly commercial warehouse buildings, garages, and lofts into a campus of parks and an office/hotel complex. There would be a dramatic twin-tower complex encompassing the land from 43rd Street to 45th Street, from First to Second Avenue, thereby eliminating 44th Street. UNDC called for the creation of a superblock, or a self-contained enclave bounded by First and Second Avenue, Forty-third and Forty-fifth Streets. The superblock would need to remove the existing landmark twin Beaux-Arts Apartments at 307 and 310 East Forty-fourth Street, except for the United States Mission to the UN on First Avenue. There would be twin forty-story towers on the same street, Forty-fourth Street, with a ring of eleven- to nineteen-story structures around the edge of the superblock. Each tower would be square in its footprint, but rotated 45 degrees off the street grid, to provide two millions square feet of space and one million square feet of office/apartment/hotel use.

Both the Rockefeller and Ford Foundations each gave $100,000 to initiate the planning. The initial planning called for creating an unbroken park between 43rd and 45th Streets, "radically changing the existing traffic patterns along First Avenue. Virtually all through traffic would be eliminated to accomplish the joining of property on the west side of First Avenue with the United Nations enclave" and removing 44th Street from the map.

The envisioned proposal planned for three "platform levels". The top-most, 1st level would be a grand, majestically landscaped park, accessed by a stairway or "gateway" on Second Avenue side as well as from the UN side. The middle 2nd, or concourse level would be accessed from Second Avenue at the present sidewalk level, lined with restaurants and retail shops. The lowermost, 3rd level, would have 1,200 parking spaces for visitors to the UN and the new UN Visitor Center, a city bus stop and terminal for the many chartered buses traveling to the UN daily. First Avenue buses would be rerouted through a passageway below the Visitor Center with a local bus stop there. All other through-traffic would be rerouted through the existing tunnel with an entrance to the FDR Drive.

==== June 1968 ====
Governor Rockefeller signed a bill for the UN expansion project.

The twin-tower idea with three platformed levels was encouraged.

==== November 1968 ====
Finally, the UN body itself — the delegation of the UN General Assembly — was sent a proposal by the Fund for Planning and Development, upon which the 155-member delegation would vote. The addition of a park on pilings or piers eighty-five feet wide and stretching from north five blocks from 38th Street would include tennis courts, jogging and bicycling paths, a hockey/ice skating rink, and bocce courts. The park would be directly accessed from the UN. Also added to the proposal was the UN's International School, from the present location of a loft and an old, leased building, to a site on First Avenue between 38th and 39th Streets.

==== January 1969 — UNDC Formed ====
In January 1969, Rockefeller's promised UN expansion project was slowing coming to fruition. As part of the previous bill passed in June 1968 in Albany, a 9-member board was formed with jointly- appointed members by Rockefeller and Mayor Lindsay, called the United Nations Development Corporation or UNDC. The approval of the first proposal led to the formation of the UNDC. The UNDC was given powers to assemble land and "issue tax-free bonds to create an overall plan and development scheme for the UN expansion project." Since the UNDC was created by the New York state Legislature, it had been given the right to acquire land and to create a plan for what was declared to be a "special design area, and therefore exempt from local zoning regulations, with eminent domain powers, and the ability to apply for state funding, issue tax-exempt bonds, and act as a developer with a tax-exempt status like a not-for-profit corporation". David McCloy was to head and organise the UNDC, who was once the head of the World Bank. Also appointed to the UNDC was Arthur J. Goldberg, the previous US ambassador to the UN under President Johnson; an Associate Supreme Court justice and Secretary of Labor under President John F. Kennedy; and recipient of the Presidential Medal of Freedom. Goldberg served during World War II as a captain in the United States Army and the Office of Strategic Services. The UNDC also included a list of bankers, realtors, attorneys, and city planners. One city planner was Donald H. Elliott, Chairman of the City Planning Commission. Preliminary plans for the UN expansion project state that the Ford Foundation had begun the financing with a grant of $400,000 to the fund for Area Development and Planning. The Ford Foundation "began many months ago to quietly purchase properties in the two-block area to avoid sending prices soaring through speculation. the properties in turn were to be sold to the city at cost, to the corporation's planning". Under the same bill signed by Rockefeller, the corporation had the power to secure private financing by issuing bonds. The final proposal needed unanimous approval by the City Planning Commission, the New York City Housing Authority, and the now-defunct New York City Board of Estimate.

==== February 1969 ====
Initially planned was a seven-story building, to be designed by Harrison and Abramovitz, that would incorporate the Midtown Tunnel's ventilation shaft, which would provide 693,946 square feet of space. It was proposed to be attached to the UN Secretariat Building, connecting with other levels to unify the space. The planned office building was to be completed within three to five years for $50 million.

==== April 1969 ====
Opposition from the City Council, and Turtle Bay citizens complained that the secrecy of the project, with "two high towers, landscaped parks, offices, luxury apartments, a hotel and a United Nations Visitors Center" was hidden from the Turtle Bay Civic Association and Tudor City civic groups. The Methodist Church at the Church Center of the UN voiced concerns that its secrecy only fostered more opposition. The opposition was opposed especially by residents of the Tudor City neighborhood. In order to allay the fears of the Tudor City residents, directly to the south of the proposed UN expansion project, the city Planning Commission passed a new zoning change, ruling that the Tudor city residents. With backing from the Turtle Bay Civic Association and community residents, the city had been flooded with outcries from Tudor City and the surrounding apartments complexes (see below under "Opposition and Controversy").

==== November 1969 — Revised second plan ====
A second proposal by KRJDA followed the Turtle Bay Study. It called for"considerable enlargement of the project." The proposal consisted of three forty-floor towers organised around a five-hundred-foot-high glass lobby, and a skyscraper to house a seven-hundred-room hotel at the corner of Forty-Fourth Street and UN Plaza.The complex would have 4.2 million square feet of commercial office space occupying two blocks between Forty-Third and Forty-Fourth Streets in front of the UN Secretariat. By November 1969, of the four initial four sub-projects, the last component was to go forward and prove the most interesting. KRJDA had just completed the Ford Foundations' building.

After the first proposal by KRJDA was rejected, Roche replaced it with the second revised plan, unveiled in November 1969. Some have said that this was his grand idea of recreating Paxton's Crystal Palace. this came about since a feasibility study that the UNDC commissioned from KRJDA found that the first plan would not be self-supporting, which it was required to be. Therefore, a decision was made by Roche to increase the floor area to plot size ratio from twelve to eighteen. The result would add more rentable office space with the result of increasing revenue, making the total floor area 8 million square feet. In the same two-block area immediately to the west of the General Assembly building, between 43rd and 45th Streets and First and Second Avenues, would rise four buildings if the proposal was accepted. One of these buildings would be an apartment-hotel; the other three buildings or towers would be interconnected with the apartment-hotel. These three towers would be used for office space for the U.N. and related international organizations. These three towers, each 40 stories high, would splay out in three directions like the hands on a clock: 12 o'clock, 3 o'clock, and 9 o'clock. The towers would branch out from a 40-story glass-enclosed, domed "arcade" which would have some balconies connecting upper floors of the three structures. All three towers would be sheathed in a mirror-like glass similar to those adjacent to them, thereby reflecting nearby buildings and the UN Secretariat. A rotunda at the base of the glassed-in arcade would lead to three levels, all devoted primarily to visitors' facilities. The top-most level would enclose a park with trees and a swimming pool. Acquisition of the land was to begin in late I970, with construction of the $300-million center to begin in 1972.

Second revision of UN Plaza, view northwest

The grand plan, developed under the UNDC ― who were taken aback by the proposal of three immense faceted towers all joined with a hotel wing ― were impressed. Ada Louise Huxtable, architectural critic for the New York Times, said that if the plan went to completion, the "building is a tour-de-force, a giant trick with mirrors." Roche-Dinkeloo planned for a central rotunda and concourses "topped by an awe-inspiring 40-story, 540-foot-high domed court." The first plan submitted for review in April 1968 with the three-platform levels, and removing 44th Street was revised to allow it to be "more financially self-supporting", even though the first plan "was more successful in the resolution of the tie-up between the United Nations buildings and their environs, to create what could truly be called a UN District".

Second revision of UN Plaza

The $300-million complex, which called for four forty-story towers to be sheathed in a glass facade, that had never been used before in New York City, and was planned to be a massive crystalline superstructure. In essence, everything from 43rd St to 45th Street, between First and Second Avenues would be enclosed in glass. There would be three buildings containing 3 million square feet of office space, with a fourth building on First Avenue containing a 700-room hotel. The three-office building complex was to surround a glass-roofed 540-foot-high atrium, also forty-stories tall enclosing a visitor center. This proposal all but eliminated earlier proposals of a large green campus, parks and two office towers for the UN. This proposal did not need to demolish the relatively recently erected Church Center for the United Nations or the Boys Club, both on First Avenue, nor did it need to shut off First Avenue as proposed in the earlier recommendations. However, Forty-fourth Street would need to be closed off. The second, revised plan, which called for a massive 540-foot-tall rotunda, would eliminate the earlier green, college-like campus proposed a year-and-a half ago. The Church Center for the UN and the Boys club would not have to be raised. However, it raised questions by Ada Louise Huxtable as far as the real purpose behind the structure. "The question being asked is whether the (UNDC) with its quasi-public status, tax-free bonds and substantial city tax abatement, is (completing) the master plan for which it was created, or putting up some elegantly speculative real estate." Of the proposed 4.2 million square feet of office space, half would be rentals at the going market rate. the second, revised plan called for increasing the floor area ratio from 12 to 18 (Floor area ratio (FAR) is the measurement of a building's floor area in relation to the size of the lot/parcel that the building is located on). The three buildings would unite at a central glassed-in court also 40-stories high. The 700-room hotel for UN visitors and permanent residents would also include a shopping arcade, theatres, 280 housing units, and an enclosed public park. The center will contain extensive tourist facilities, including bus docking, information centers, and restaurants, to ease the burden of the 2 million yearly visitors. There are three forty-story towers for the use of the UN missions and international organizations, bordering a glassed-in court. The buildings will be sheathed in the highly reflective glass first used by Eero Saarinen & Associates' Bell Laboratories building, in Holmdel, New Jersey. Glass awnings will help unify the stores with the street, and glass-roofed entrance plazas would bring the life of the city into the new center.

==== December 1969 — third plan ====
A month after the second revised Roche-Dinkeloo plan was submitted, the UN voted 62–10, to authorise approval of another 3rd plan on a 16-acre bloc from 41st to 42nd Street between First Avenue and the East River. It would be the first major building project to the UN enclave since the UN was built.

Planned park to be built along the East River on pilings, and new building for the UN, December 1969

This called for an $80-million project earmarked by the UN. Its Budgetary Committee agreed to stimulate the project with $25 million. Another $20 million was anticipated from the US delegation to the UN and agreed to ask Congress for the funds. Mayor Lindsay then promised he would ask New York City to match the 20 million, and to donate the land for the building site, valued at $10 million. The $15-million deficit would come from the UNDC's private funds and channels. Also voted on was the construction of a park to be built on platforms, and resting on pilings on the East River from 38th Street to 43rd Street. This new block proposal already contained a park infrequently used by the community and the massive ventilation shaft of the Queens Midtown Tunnel. A new 8-story building would be built to accommodate the much-needed office space by the UN. The new 3-acre park to be built over the East River would accommodate both the public and UN personnel.

Although the United States voted for the expansion project, it also voted to abstain from the Budgetary Committee's approval of a change in the text of the resolution introduced by France at the last minute. This change called for distributing UN activities between New York and Geneva, Switzerland (or some other city). The French proposal was viewed by the United States as an attempt to weaken the UN complex in New York City. The French maintained that if New York City was unable to meet the demands of the UN, then the UN should look elsewhere for expansion. Critics of this French proposal saw it as a further effort to undermine the united UN enclave in New York City by transferring economic and social activities overseas — possibly France. The proposal would come up for approval by the General Assembly, and the United States hoped to delete it before it went further. The US Missions warned that the French proposal would fragment the United Nations activities. Privately they hinted that it would be more difficult to secure congressional funding if Congress thought there might be a fragmenting of the US-based complex. The prospects of enlarging the UN enclave in the United States brought praise and blame for New York City as host. Soviet-backed countries (Bulgaria and Cuba) accused the CIA of eavesdropping on their telephone conversations, while Arab countries (Syria) accused pro-Israeli demonstrators of blocking their premises. As it appeared that voting appeared politically motivated, Western bloc countries such as Norway and Great Britain praised the efforts of private citizens (Rockefeller, Ford) and investors for their unifying, altruistic motives for engendering a truly "United Nations" enclave. Zenon Rossides of Cyprus went further and addressed the UN over maintaining a unified UN, arguing that "New York City is a dynamic city — the center of the world."

==== February 1970 ====
Noted architecture experts, which included Ada Louise Huxtable, an architecture critic for the New York Times, wrote that "only a super scrooge" would vote against a grand scheme of three large towers connected to a fourth UN hotel that solved the UN's office, visitors center and hotel problems in one fell swoop." Huxtable recounts the controversial 4-to-3 decision by the City Planning Commission, which still needed a final go-ahead by the Board of Estimate on March 12, 1970. Huxtable did describe an apparent quid pro quo decision for the UNDC to fund "Waterside," a mixed-income housing project which was the UNDC's plan to relocate the residents and businesses for the UN enclave by using their tax-free bonds, so that a vote against the UNDC's massive complex would also be a vote against Waterside. But Huxtable stressed that the fully-enclosed park by the massive tower complex plan did not have the full backing of the community, although it had received a slim 4-to-3 approval by the Planning Commission. At least the first plans in 1967 of two slender diamond-shaped towers surrounded by four smaller buildings, arising from within a mid-block park, had community approval. Huxtable questioned the city's affordability of a $300-million project, versus practicality for the UN to fulfill its needs and pointed, out that the city did not need to build a massive "megalomaniacal" building only to fill half the rooms with UN personnel, while the other half are rented for prime real estate dollars. She states how ironic it would be that New Yorkers would be subsidising the structure but were offered no other option but the one presented by the UNDC. The city had been placed in an awkward position to accept the entire grand scheme, from beginning to end, or not at all. Huxtable states that the UNDC plan was misleading, and as stated by Huxtable, "a poor substitute for a large outdoor park: one enclosed by glass." Moreover, the changing of its zoning laws for the structure from R10 to R18 would set a precedent not seen anywhere else in New York City and at a time when it could not underwrite its own basic needs in housing.

==== March 1970 ====
On March 19, 1970, the proposed plan of the four towers connected to a hotel enclosed in glass went before a public hearing of the Board of Estimate for approval. However, in light of the heavy opposition from the neighborhood, the plan was tabled. Estimated costs for the four-tower glass-sheathed project were also revealed, which had now soared to $350 million. Moreover, a court order was obtained by Assemblyman Andrew J. Stein which prevented the Board of Estimate from voting on the plan until "legal challenges to the project" were resolved. Councilman Carter Burden, a descendant of "Commodore" Cornelius Vanderbilt and previous supporter of Mayor Lindsay, said the plan "demonstrates the flagrant hypocrisy of Mayor Lindsay's campaign commitments to community involvement". Charles Moerdler, a right-hand man of Lindsay and former director of Lindsay's Metropolitan Transportation Authority section for Bridges and Tunnels, said the project was on the "brink of idiocy". Opponents of the plan had fought the UNDC in court, in public hearings, and private negotiations, and there seemed to be no budging on the proposal except in reducing the FAR from 18 to 17. Manhattan borough president and attorney Percy Sutton could not decide after questioning UNDC officials. The crowd present at the hearing, who were unanimously opposed to the project, over shouted board members who quickly began to express skepticism over the project.

The following day, March 20, 1970, once-supportive members of Mayor Lindsay delayed action on the planned $350‐million superblock across from the United Nations. Expressions of anger by Turtle Bay residents, forced Lindsay's hand in tabling the Board of Estimate's discussion in the closed-door meeting until April 16, 1970. It was again stated that 600–800 housing units were going to be torn down, and only to relocate the angry residents and the city to have to pay for the relocation and new housing costs. Opponents said that the plan, which was an expanded version of a proposal that won neighborhood support a year ago, was too grandiose and unnecessarily crowded. The closed-door meeting was held because of a lawsuit filed by Assemblyman Andrew Stein. Earlier, a New York State Supreme Court justice joined the board from acting until Stein's challenge to the constitutionality of the act that created the development corporation was heard. However, an appellate division allowed the hearing to proceed and it ruled that a vote could be taken for the planned proposal regardless of Stein's lawsuit. Although the plan was delayed, there was approval of the "groundwork" for a plan to continue.

==== April 1970 ====
Finally, the controversial plan for a newly quoted-$350‐million project was approved by the Board of Estimate. However, opposing city politicians promised to continue the fight in court after the project was given final city approval. The decision affirmed Lindsay's intentions for the UN to remain in New York. However powerful resistance from Turtle Bay residents were outraged that the mayor had met in a closed-door session, not allowing the public to hear the conversations of the meeting on March 20, 1970. They affirmed that the $350 million plan was outrageous and that it would create overcrowding in the community. Even so, the Board of Estimate was still confused about the plan to permit the UNDC to finance the stalled Waterside housing project — with 1,400 units to be built on a platform in the East River next to Bellevue Hospital — in exchange for a promise of space for some of the tenants that were to be ousted by the United Nations superblock. Percy Sutton warned of other proposals in which there had been "massive destruction and then parking lots". Borough Presidents Percy E. Sutton of Manhattan and Robert Abrams of the Bronx voted against the idea. Abrams asked how, in a city where the housing supply was shrinking, "can we begin to have the destruction of good housing units?" Concessions made by the UNDC and the city still did not sit well with board members who voted against the idea. The city had set aside $60 million for the construction of these apartments.

==== June 1970 ====
The Waterside project, linked to the UN-enclave plan, was approved. The plan called for a 1,470‐apartment, mixed‐income project slated to be built on platforms over the East River that had been shelved since 1967 due to lack of money. Of those 1,470 apartments, 360 apartments were set aside for the proposed United Nations enclave for tenants displaced by the proposed center were guaranteed a new place to live, and Waterside has been given priority. The city had set aside $60 million for the Waterside complex, and a stand-by loan.

==== August 1970 ====
The lawsuit entered by Assemblyman Andrew J. Stein to prevent the Board of Estimate from voting on the plan until "legal challenges to the project were resolved", was finally adjudicated. New York State Supreme Court Justice John M. Murtagh upheld plans for the expansion of the United Nations complex in Manhattan, thwarting any further plans by Stein to erode the credibility of the UNDC. Justice Murtagh, in a five-page ruling, said the plans by the UNDC and related city resolutions to enlarge the United Nations facilities were "not subject to review because they were legislative in character" and that the "UNDC was created by the State Legislature on May 31, 1968, to develop the expansion project between 43d and 45th Streets and First and Second Avenues". In other words, it was legally bound and the UNDC could not be discounted. The City Planning Commission and Board of Estimate then approved the required zoning amendments permitting the enlargement with Lindsay administration support. The lone holdout was Percy Sutton, Manhattan borough president. Earlier that year, Justice Murtagh was the target of retaliation by the Black Panthers with firebombs. Murtagh had been presiding at pretrial hearings of the Black Panthers accused of conspiracy to bomb public places in New York City.

==== November 1971 ====
Up to this time, the plan for the mega -project had been scrapped, and Roche replaced it with the single tower idea. L. Thomas Appleby, the new UNDC president, predicted that the complex would bring the city a 10‐fold increase in annual tax income over the $75,000 that the property in the area now brings. Although the visitors' center would be tax‐exempt, he pointed out that visitors would spend unforeseen millions into the city. Appleby said that much-needed cash flow for New York City would come from the UN site, and that the UN had become a big business for New York City ever since Rockefeller bought the land for $8.5 million, and gifting it to New York City. In 1971, the UN had become the city's leading tourist attraction, drawing two million visitors a year from out of town and overseas. UN rental business and personal spending is another part of it. City authorities estimated that at least $135 million flowed annually into the economy as a result of spending by UN delegations and staff. The UN body itself was responsible for investing $500 million in United States bonds and blue‐chip stocks from 80 percent of the accumulated pension funds via UN staff members and related agencies. Local property taxes soared in Turtle Bay, even though the UN 16-acre site itself is tax‐free under the 1947 agreement between the United States Government and the UN. Appleby stated that the US government spends $86.3 million annually, Washington's largest single outlay for the UN to the United Nations Development Program where UN hoped to attract foreign investors to underdeveloped countries.

This was seconded by the UN's Children's Fund and its outlay for rent. Both UNICEF and the UN Development Program were housed in commercial buildings, and together their annual rent was close to $1 million. Threats to take these agencies overseas, primarily to Switzerland, encouraged further development of the UN enclave.

==== August 1972 ====
By this time, the $300-million plan was scrapped for a leaner, one-building model. The UNDC who announced the start of the first phase of the project expected that the $30‐million building would be opened by the spring of 1975. The 38‐story skyscraper included a hotel with 280 rooms, an enclosed rooftop tennis court, a 40‐foot pool, sauna, lounges, and a restaurant and meeting rooms for diplomats. The second floor would be taken up by a visitors center for the 2 million visitors annually who come to the United Nations. The street floor would have space for stores and a coffee shop, and open to visitors. A skyscraper to be constructed overlooking the United Nations will allow tenants to work. confer, live, eat shop, and swim without stepping outside the premises. Plans called for the construction of an enclosed bridge or crosswalk spanning First Avenue, which would connect the new building on the west side of the avenue with the United Nations property on the east side. The bridge was planned partly for convenience but mainly for a security feature.

==== 1974 ====
Vince Scully, an architectural critic for Architectural Forum, stated that the large glass enclosure, much like a greenhouse, was possible because of the rubber gaskets that the glass panels were set in. Scully states how he was fascinated by the "streamlined massing and shiny spandrel bands of the enormously high glazed court, a testament to Owen Williams, one of the first modernist architects to use glass facades. According to Scully, Roche's fascination with glass began when he was involved with the window detailing of the General Motors Research Center, designed when Roche was first working in Saarinen's office, and the Ford Foundation Building. Roche strove to recreate The Crystal Palace designed by Joseph Paxton for the Great Exhibition, commissioned by Prince Albert in 1851.

=== Opposition and controversy ===
An article appeared in the New York Times on April 12, 1968, that had taken many in the city and its government by surprise. Although there were mixed feelings over the Turtle Bay-UN expansion up to this time, it developed into bitter opposition to the proposal. The Community Board 6 of the City Council of New York, responsible for Turtle Bay, felt that there was general agreement to the plan from local citizenry, according to its vice-chairman, Peter Detmold. However, Detmold stated that he thought the plans for the upcoming project needed to be kept confidential, so as not to promote speculative land-buying. However, this secrecy backfired, and only fueled more opposition to the plan from local civic groups. In May 1968, after the project was announced, a brochure was printed describing the project and released to New Yorkers, apparently anticipating the fallout of public opposition. The majority leader of the City Council of New York and particularly residents of Tudor City feared that the Ford Foundation and the Rockefellers intended to buy their apartment complex to use the land for the UN expansion. The brochure which surfaced, and whose origin has been disputed, was purportedly published by the Fund for Area Planning and Development. "Few of the property owners in the area had even heard of the Fund for Area Planning and Development which had taken a small suite on 44th St. No name plate is visible from the street." The brochure illustrated the extensive redevelopment plans set for the Turtle Bay community: withheld from the public. Both the majority leader of the City Council's State Legislation Committee and its president — David Ross and Frank D. O'Connor, respectively — adamantly refused acknowledging any endorsement of the plan listed in the brochure, even though both were named in the brochure as de facto endorsement of the UN expansion project.

NY home-rule

"Counties, cities, towns and villages are "general purpose" units of local government, which are granted broad home rule powers to regulate the quality of life in their communities."

— NY.gov

The Planning Commission chairman, Donald Elliott, accused the City Council initially of supporting the plan, and then backing out, even going further to state the City Council's secretaries had signed off on the cost of the brochure, thus making them directly linked to the project. Councilman J. Raymond Jones, the committee chairman for State Legislation of the City Council, refused to hear anything further on the matter and the discussion was tabled until he had received a "home-rule message" from New York State's Legislature under New York's home-rule laws.

In June 1968, Governor Rockefeller weighed in and authorized a bill earmarking the UN expansion project. Rockefeller contended that although the City Council had not exercised their home-rule municipal rights under New York's home-rule laws by not sending a "home-rule message," Rockefeller deemed it unnecessary.

Home rule powers available to New York's City Council are necessary for building on any property in Manhattan, yet Rockefeller contended that the extent of home-rule powers (self-government which has limited autonomy in internal affairs) is still a dependent political unit and makes New York's City Council a full partner with New York State and the shared responsibility for providing services to the United Nations. An aide to Governor Rockefeller stated in the New York Times on June 4, 1968, that a "home-rule message" was not required and that he as governor had the power to supersede any home-rule message.

After opposition arose from within the City Council, citizens and neighbors in the area openly complained that the secrecy of the project of "high towers, landscaped parks, offices, luxury apartments, a hotel, and a United Nations Visitors Center" was "conveniently" hidden from the Turtle Bay Civic Association. The Rev. Dudley Ward of the Methodist Church at the Church Center of the UN voiced concern that its secrecy only fostered more opposition, and although there were mixed outcries from the Turtle Bay Civic groups, most objected to its building. This opposition was followed closely by U.S. Congressmen from New York City, and residents of New York City in general, particularly the Tudor City neighborhood to the south of the proposed project.

By November 1969, outcry over the $300-million complex, which called for four forty-story towers to be sheathed in a glass facade, had never been used before in New York City and was planned to be a massive crystalline superstructure. In effect, it would be three buildings containing 3 million square feet of office space, with a fourth building on First Avenue containing a 700-room hotel. The three-office building complex was to surround a glass-roofed 540-foot-high atrium, also forty stories tall enclosing a visitor center, akin to the Crystal Palace of Paxton. This proposal all but eliminated earlier proposals of a large green campus, parks, and two office towers for the UN. This proposal did not need to demolish the relatively recently erected Church Center for the United Nations or the Boys Club, both on First Avenue nor did it need to shut off First Avenue as proposed in the earlier recommendations. However, Forty-fourth Street would need to be closed off. The second, revised plan, which called for a massive 540-foot-tall rotunda, raised questions by Ada Louise Huxtable as far as the real purpose behind the structure. "The question being asked is whether the (UNDC) with its quasi-public status, tax-free bonds and substantial city tax abatement, is (completing) the master plan for which it was created, or putting up some elegantly speculative real estate." Of the proposed 4.2 million square feet of office space, half would be rentals at the going market rate. the second, revised plan called for increasing the floor area ratio from 12 to 18 (Floor area ratio (FAR) is the ratio of a building's floor area compared to the size of the lot/parcel that the building is located on).

In November 1969, there was official criticism by New York City's politicians for the four 40-story buildings in the area bounded by First and Second Avenues and 43rd and 45th Streets. Congressman Ed Koch, City Councilwoman Carol Greitzer, and Councilman-elect Carter Burden unanimously voiced disapproval. Koch thought it was "a bonanza for commercial speculative landlords:" Councilwoman Greitzer from Turtle Bay said the "residents were not adequately consulted". Councilman-elect Burden said he thought the plan was "railroaded through".

In December 1969, the residents of Turtle Bay mounted a broad campaign to oppose the massive UN expansion plan presented earlier to the City Planning Commission. Protesters contended that since half the planned office space of 4.2-million sq. ft. in the four towers was to be used by the UN, it was a "land grab by real estate interests". The City Council stressed the demand by the UN for much-needed room to grow, so that it remained for New York City for quell the fears of possibly moving to another country. Amid these fears they cited the support of some Turtle Bay Civic Association members on the earlier proposals. Those earlier plans called for smaller buildings on the same site across First Avenue from most of 43rd to 45th Streets, and two small parcels in each of two blocks directly to the north. The earlier version would have produced buildings with a total floor area twelve times the lot size, which was the present zoning limit. The present proposal envisioned a ratio of 18 times the lot size, according to Roche-Dinkeloo. The residents also complained bitterly that Donald H. Elliott, chairman of the city Planning Commission maintained a dual role, thus constituting a conflict of interest. To counter this criticism Elliott would demand from New York authorities that he would secure a ruling by the city's corporation counsel allowing for his dual interest. Turtle Bay residents also complained that the high-density nature of the project would encourage future private real estate ventures to request similar zoning changes, thus increasing pressure on the local communities composed of brownstones and smaller residential buildings to be overshadowed. Many complained sharply that it would set a zoning precedent for future building of similar-sized edifices in New York City. A decision for the go-ahead by New York City for "some type" of building was approved nonetheless by a narrow vote of four votes to three, as the Planning commission's president, Gerald R. Coleman, apparently broke ranks and voted in favor of the plan. After postponing the meeting for a week, he voted yes after hearing testimonies from the Turtle Bay Civic Association and the other six members.

Mayor John Lindsay and City Planning Commission chairman Donald H. Elliott were enthusiastic about the plan, although laden with problems from the get-go. The Housing and Development Administration needed first approval of the plan, to be seconded by the City Planning Commission of New York who would make recommendations to the Board of Estimate of New York City. Most of the public sided with the outspoken critics and bitter opposition to the plan, especially by Congressional representative Edward Koch (future mayor of New York City). Congressman Koch questioned the bulk and density of the building, from 12 to 18 floor-area ratio (FAR), which would have set a precedent in New York.

One outspoken critic opposing the UN expansion was Pete Hamill, a native New Yorker and journalist for the New York Post. Hamill's daily column expressed the concerns of the Turtle Bay residents, including his own opinions. In one article he wrote, "The assumption that it carries about this town, that these free-loading diplomats assigned to the UN have some blessed right to live across the street from their job, while the rest of us have to come screaming into Manhattan on subway cages, is beyond me." State Assemblyman Andrew Stein (future Borough President and City Council President) reverberated what Hamill had already suggested. He callously proposed that the UN development be moved to Welfare Island — once used for hospitals and city prisons, renamed Welfare Island in 1921 (present-day Roosevelt Island), summing up his and his constituents' resentment succinctly. "You can read the UN Charter from end to end, and you will find nothing that guarantees, to its personnel and officials the privilege of rolling out of bed, and directly going into their offices." Donald Elliott had come under intense scrutiny since he was a member of both the UNDC and the Planning Commission, an obvious conflict of interest, which became the focus of Pete Hamill's articles. Elliott denied the charges of a conflict of interest. He followed that up with a response to Hamill and Koch by producing a letter from the UNDC, which stated that the Chairman of the Planning commission must be a member of the UNDC, and as such, has approval of the city for his dual role. This temporarily stopped his critics.

In January 1970, the Planning Commission narrowly approved the vote. Although the voting was never made public, it was speculated that Donald R. Coleman cast the deciding vote in favor of the expansion project. It was also speculated that Coleman, who had reservations over the plan from its inception, was eventually convinced by UNDC officials, Mayor Lindsay, and Arthur Goldberg to reconsider and pass the UN proposal.

Despite the criticism, journalistic mockery, and public outcry, the project was approved by a five-to-four majority of the City Planning Commission in January 1970 for only a combination office and hotel building on the corner of 44th Street and First Avenue. This was quickly followed by an approval by the Board of Estimate in April 1970. At this point, UNDC, having failed earlier to obtain the financing required, turned to New York State's legislature. An agreement was finally reached but with some compromises. Koch's continual questioning of the FAR enabled an agreement to be reached where a reduction of the FAR from 18 to 15 was conceded. A $75-million limit on the state's guaranteed bonds was reached. The estimated construction cost of the building was approximately $31.5 million.

John J. McCloy, chairman of the UNDC said that the building would be virtually completely rented at the time of its scheduled opening. McCloy had also said that the building was made possible largely by an initial grant of $3 million in "seed money" from the Ford Foundation. Mayor Abraham Beame said the UNDC would pay New York City $450,000 a year in rent for the land, which was more than four times the property taxes obtained from the previous structures. This was crucial since at this time New York City was in the midst of the worst financial crisis of its history. The UNDC was able to sell $55.2 million in bonds, enough to finance the first phase of the Roche-Dinkeloo development: One United Nations Plaza.

Roche had not anticipated the public furor over the large complex nor had he envisioned the equally-powerful backlash from New York politicians. Roche had dealt with New York's building and zoning rules on the Ford Foundation Building, but the combination of the now-present City Council and social elites in Turtle Bay was a new entity to which he was not accustomed. The size of the project raised questions by many of his critics. Ada Huxtable's remarks, such as "the 370-foot dome of St. Peter's in Rome or a 363-foot Saturn or Apollo rocket [can fit inside the massive glass enclosure] with more than 150 feet to spare," emboldened further criticism. Huxtable asked, "whether the $300 million budget had taken away from much-needed social housing projects," considering the economic slump that New York City faced in the early 70s. In reality, the public debate boiled down to large-scale economic forces versus public interest. In an article in the Democratic Action Daily News, Roche recalled almost having been attacked by Turtle Bay residents at a town hall meeting to discuss the proposal. This added to the mounting opposition and eventual scrapping of the mega-project Roche had envisioned. It forced the UNDC, and Roche, to build the UN enclave in a piecemeal fashion.

=== Planning ===
Kevin Roche soon realised that Manhattan was the ultimate architectural challenge. He would need to employ all his skills as a programmatic architect, and make use of the site and economic constraints imposed by the New York City: to maximise square-footage while addressing the lack of public park space. He would use it as grounds for innovating while navigating a rough political sea.

Roche began with the basics. "A building is crafted from "traditional columnar forms with a base, a shaft, and a capital and an office building needs a core." When Roche was asked if his design was minimalistic, he replied by stating, "Simplifying and abstracting the essence of that form is the same, whether it is composed on a more traditional line or on a modernist line. [One UN Plaza] is a minimalist, abstract form, a sculpture." Roche agreed that the rectangular floor space should have a minimum of 13,000 sq. ft. "The form of the UN Plaza buildings was derived from required setbacks mandated by fire laws and change in function of the buildings."

According to Roche, three zoning possibilities existed for designing buildings. In the "first standard zoning" possibility, "there is a single box, a sheer tower built at 50 percent of the site to increase lot occupancy for reduction of permitted bulk. This is the only chance of building a truly rectangular building." While the other possibilities can follow the property lines resulting in odd-shaped office spaces that are difficult to use, the first, a strict tower proposal can have thirty-four stories with 10,300 sq. ft. per floor at a grand total of 350,200 sq. ft. Within the property confines, and with existing zoning "it became apparent that there was no clear satisfactory solution, neither in terms of function, or public good." If he built right off the street and straight up, Roche would be compounding an already hopeless situation. "Do I just design a shaft and walk away, and say, well, that's the nature of the building? There is nothing else to do? On one hand you might be [helping], but then, you might not."

In the "second, alternate" possibility, "One builds right off the property line and build up 85 feet, then sets back. This elevation point is referred to as the sky exposure plane, an imaginary plane where you recede and angle until you reach a point at which the area of the building is forty percent of the area of the property site." According to Roche, you can build fifteen times the area of the property site. "It is three boxes, one stacked up on another. The first box is six stories high, at 21,000 sq. ft. per floor (126,000 total sq. ft.), the second box is fourteen stories high, with 14,000 sq. ft. per floor (196,000 total sq. ft.), and the third box is sixteen stories high with 8,500 sq. ft. per floor (136,000 total sq. ft.). This yields a grand total of 458,000 sq. ft. or 15 FAR. The first standard zoning drawback is that it "fails to fully realise the site's potential since more than half of the floors would be too small for any practical use. Moreover, it provides no public space and generates no satisfactory relationships with existing buildings."

The "third, alternate zoning" possibility encourages widening of the sidewalks to set back from the street. The sky exposure plane is relaxed, but at the expense of increasing the Floor Area Ratio (FAR) up to 18. "Alternate zoning gives maximum bulk for setbacks from the building line and creates a building composed of two boxes, one eleven stories high with 14,000 sq. ft. per floor (154,000 total sq. ft.) and a second box twenty-six stories high with 8,500 sq. ft. per floor (221,000 total sq. ft. total) at a grand total of 375,000 sq. ft. However, the same dilemma arises: "Much of the floors are too small, without any relationship to other buildings."

Kevin Roche

Rectangular with modifications; setbacks in accordance with zoning regulations. Where zoning stops, the tower slants inward vertically, picking up the rhythm of the cornice heights of the surrounding buildings.

— Kevin Roche: Architecture as Environment ― Pelkonen 2011

At this point, Roche knew he had to make a decision to improve upon the lack of office and hotel space, by using a combination of possibilities. Also, he would apply for a variance from New York City's Building and Zoning, and wait the outcome from the variance decisions. Roche knew that he had to provide a "sensible" solution for much-needed office space. That was his first objective. The most sensible solution was a large rectangular floor plan with 13 or 14,000 sq. ft for at least part of it. His second objective, in view of the congested traffic area, was to provide the maximum open space possible, hopefully landscaped, and easily accessible from the street. If Roche followed these objectives, as he stated, "there would be no building at all."

The decision was reached to first build the One United Nations Plaza Hotel and Office Building on the corner of 44th Street and First Avenue. Roche was forced to build the biggest building with the largest square footage on the site according to zoning regulations and constrained by the height, not to be taller than the Secretariat Building.

One United Nations Plaza

"Further up, where the office floors give way to the smaller-bay hotel, it angles inwards again. The outside corner has been sliced off to relieve the sidewalk congestion. Shading the sidewalk, there is a glass awning."

— Kevin Roche: Architecture as Environment ― Pelkonen 2011

Since the area granted to build was designated a "special design zone," the building's exterior was allowed to rise straight up from the edge of the sidewalks without any setbacks. Offices were placed on the lower floors where the square footage space was more critical than the hotel, situated above. Thus, the tennis court which was put on the top of the building set the dimensions for the hotel.

=== Renovation ===
In February 2025, the United Nations Development Corporation and the city and state governments announced that One and Two United Nations Plaza would be renovated for $500 million. Spacesmith was hired to design the renovation, which covered 900,000 square feet (84,000 m^{2}) across both buildings. To finance the project, the UNDC would sell as much as $380 million in bonds.

== Critical reception ==
When ONE UN Plaza opened, it was met with enthusiastic response. "That is why the new UN Plaza Hotel which opened recently in New York is both a surprise and a delight," wrote Ada Louise Huxtable in The New York Times. She went on to say that up until the new hotel opened, the hotel industry was "full of mediocrity." John Morris Dixon, editor-in-chief of Progressive Architecture magazine, was fixated on the beauty of not only the skyscraper itself, but of the interior's emerald green color in the lobby and throughout the hotel.

One UN Plaza Hotel

"The flat metal grid of the glass skin is deliberately concealing and underscaled, making the height seem greater than it is, and the visual effect the more spectacular!"

— New York Times — Huxtable, 1976

Roche-Dinkeloo did all the hotel interiors unlike other hotels. The emerald green is the major color scheme throughout the public spaces, possibly reflecting on Roche's native Ireland. "The green becomes too dominant, but the plush good taste of the guest rooms' decor is redeeming." The use of large simple expanses of a single color, plain middle green (emerald green), "reveals only a practical sensibility, self-assured about working within contemporary style," said Nathan silver. "The views of the East River and the city's skyline are spectacular," said Angela Thomas of The New York Times. Rather than pass the interior decorating on to one of New York's famous fold of decorators, Roche-Dinkeloo chose to do it themselves to save money. In return, it was met with much praise. What was equally important was the addition of preventive measures for security. A car can turn quickly into the loading ramp next to the entrance, a steel door closes the area, and you are rushed up to a private room via a private elevator without having to go through the lobby. The lobby is paved with checkerboard black-and-white marble that leads straight to the chic Ambassador Grill dining room, where the similar black-and white checkerboard motif is seen, but with equilateral triangles of black and white. There is red carpeting with red chairs and wicker backs.

One UN Plaza Hotel

"There is not once false touch—no overreaching, no straining for effect."

— New York Times — Huxtable, 1976

The adjoining bar, "among the handsomest in the city," has an intricate glass ceiling which reflects light and "refracts the scene below". It has been referred to by Huxtable as trompe-l'oeil since it is illusory, and is reacted to differently by the individual viewer. Huxtable said that this creates the "most romantic setting that is the ideal dining experience." Nathan Silver states: "To show that creativity lives, the architects have provided the impressive novelty of a prism-form of pseudo-greenhouse glazing backed by mirrors that dazzle with the sparkle of hundreds of reflected lights, and has reflected planes deep in the ceiling which flicker with bits of diners and waiters in motion. The black-and-white marble floors turn up onto the walls to wainscoat height, and this motif is carried through to the reception area and the restaurant. There is a continuous chrome band along the wall above the wainscoting which conceals a dim band of indirect lighting, and above the chrome light the walls are covered with a green felt "that is so lush that people have been caught rubbing their cheeks against it".

A bigger surprise was that One UN Plaza was built for much less money than had been anticipated. There was also a larger return on money invested than had been anticipated.

UN Plaza buildings

"They belong to another moment in time, another sculpture, another kind of composition."

— Kevin Roche, 1985

== See also ==
- Architecture of New York City
- List of cities with the most skyscrapers
- List of tallest buildings
- List of tallest buildings in the United States
- Two United Nations Plaza
- Three United Nations Plaza
