= Functionalism (architecture) =

Principle that defines a type of architecture

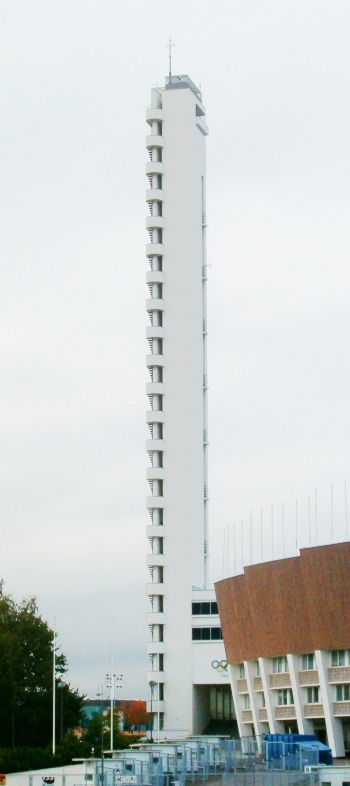
The tower of the Helsinki Olympic Stadium (Y. Lindegren & T. Jäntti, built in 1934–38)

In architecture, functionalism is the principle that buildings should be designed based solely on their purpose and function. An international functionalist architecture movement emerged in the wake of World War I, as part of the wave of Modernism. Its ideas were largely inspired by a desire to build a new and better world for the people, as broadly and strongly expressed by the social and political movements of Europe after the extremely devastating world war. In this respect, functionalist architecture is often linked with the ideas of socialism and modern humanism.

A new slight addition to this new wave of architecture was that not only should buildings and houses be designed around the purpose of functionality, architecture should also be used as a means to physically create a better world and a better life for people in the broadest sense. This new functionalist architecture had the strongest impact in Czechoslovakia, Germany, Poland, the USSR and the Netherlands, and from the 1930s also in Scandinavia and Finland.

This principle is a matter of confusion and controversy within the profession, particularly in regard to modern architecture, as it is less self-evident than it first appears.

== History ==
The theoretical articulation of functionalism in buildings can be traced back to the Vitruvian triad, where utilitas (variously translated as 'commodity', 'convenience', 'utility') stands alongside firmitas (firmness) and venustas (beauty) as one of three classic goals of architecture. Functionalist views were typical of some Gothic Revival architects. In particular, Augustus Welby Pugin wrote that "there should be no features about a building which are not necessary for convenience, construction, or propriety" and "all ornament should consist of enrichment of the essential construction of the building".

In 1896, Chicago architect Louis Sullivan coined the phrase "form follows function". However, this aphorism does not relate to a contemporary understanding of the term 'function' as utility or the satisfaction of user needs; it was instead based in metaphysics, as the expression of organic essence and could be paraphrased as meaning 'destiny'.

In the mid-1930s, functionalism began to be discussed as an aesthetic approach rather than a matter of design integrity (use). The idea of functionalism was conflated with a lack of ornamentation, which is a different matter. It became a pejorative term associated with the baldest and most brutal ways to cover space, like cheap commercial buildings and sheds, then finally used, for example in academic criticism of Buckminster Fuller's geodesic domes, simply as a synonym for 'gauche'.

For 70 years the influential American architect Philip Johnson held that the profession has no functional responsibility whatsoever, and this is one of the many views today. The position of postmodern architect Peter Eisenman is based on a user-hostile theoretical basis and even more extreme: "I don't do function."

== Modernism ==
Popular notions of modern architecture are heavily influenced by the work of the Franco-Swiss architect Le Corbusier and the German architect Mies van der Rohe. Both were functionalists at least to the extent that their buildings were radical simplifications of previous styles. In 1923, Mies van der Rohe was working in Weimar Germany, and had begun his career of producing radically simplified, lovingly detailed structures that achieved Sullivan's goal of inherent architectural beauty. Le Corbusier famously said "a house is a machine for living in"; his 1923 book Vers une architecture was, and still is, very influential, and his early built work such as the Villa Savoye in Poissy, France, is thought of as prototypically function.

== In Europe ==
=== Czechoslovakia ===
The former Czechoslovakia was an early adopter of the functionalist style, with notable examples such as Villa Tugendhat in Brno, designed by Mies van der Rohe in 1928, Villa Müller in Prague, designed by Adolf Loos in 1930, and the majority of the city of Zlín, developed by the Bata shoe company as a factory town in the 1920s and designed by Le Corbusier's student František Lydie Gahura.

Numerous villas, apartment buildings and interiors, factories, office blocks and department stores can be found in the functionalist style throughout the country, which industrialised rapidly in the early 20th century while embracing the Bauhaus-style architecture that was emerging concurrently in Germany. Large urban extensions to Brno in particular contain numerous apartment buildings in the functionalist style, while the domestic interiors of Adolf Loos in Plzeň are also notable for their application of functionalist principles.

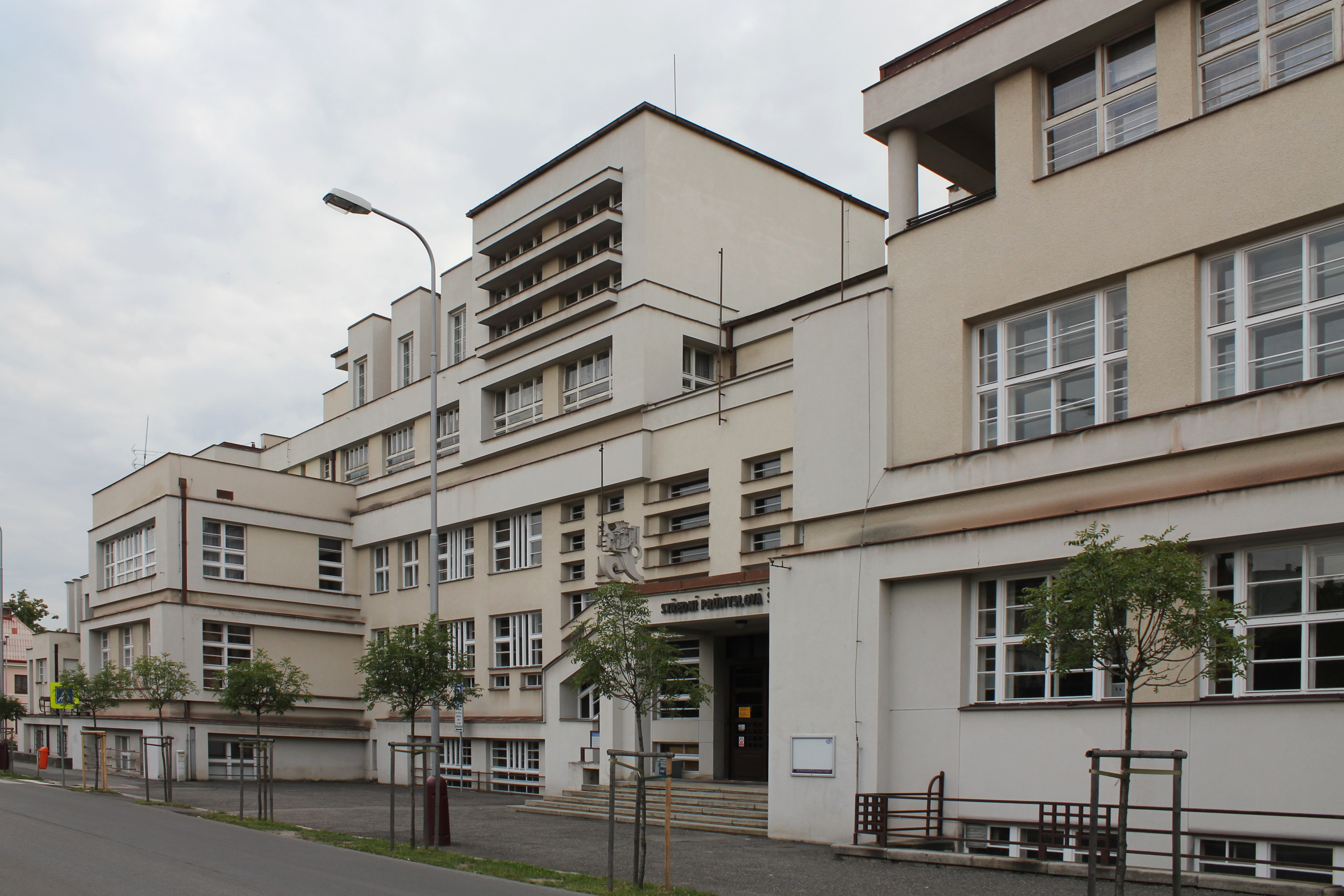
Secondary Industrial School (Mladá Boleslav), 1927, Jiří Kroha

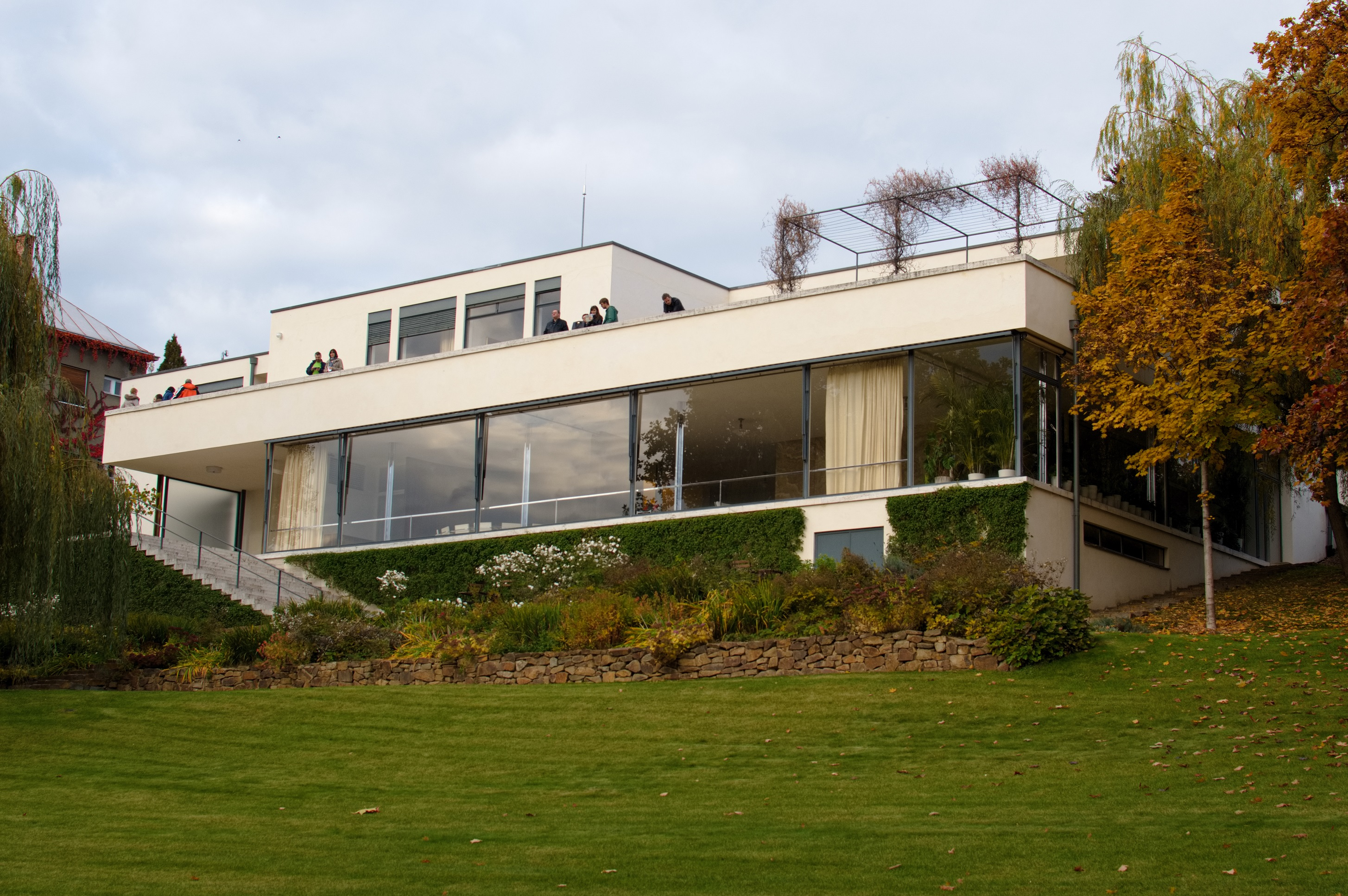
Villa Tugendhat (Brno), 1928, Ludwig Mies van der Rohe

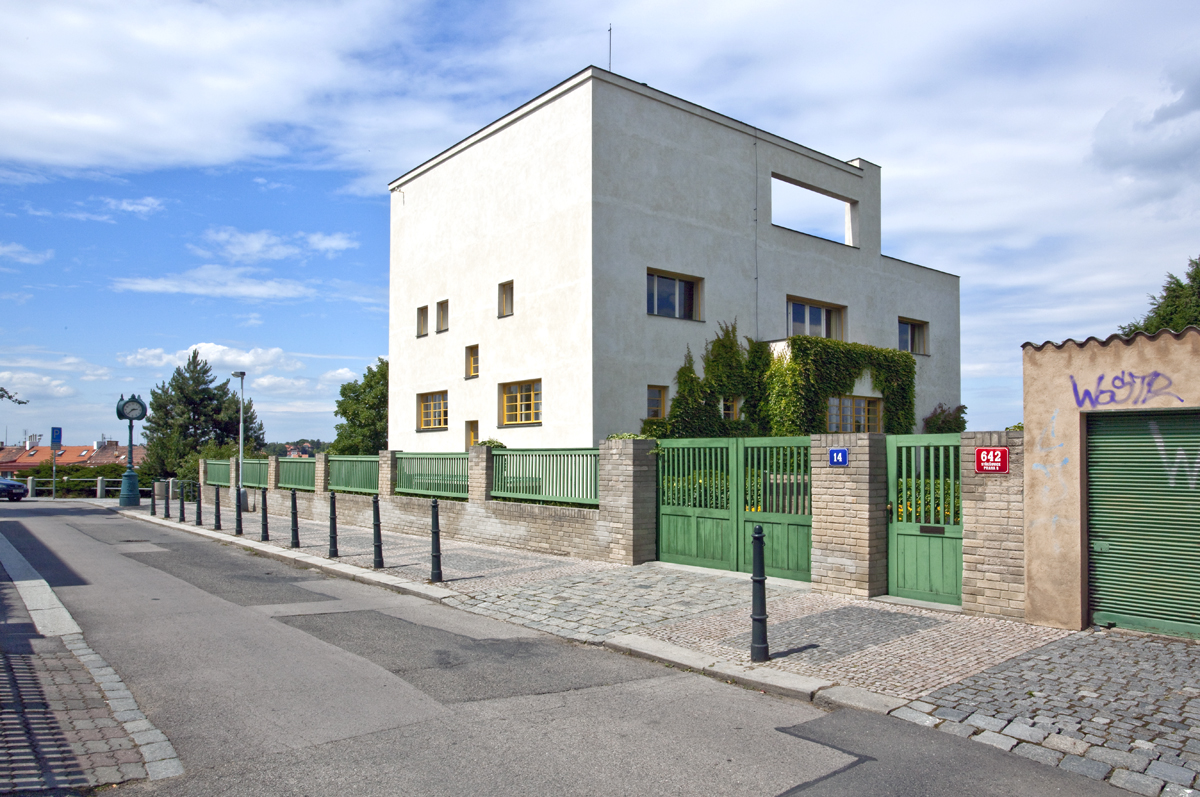
Villa Müller (Prague), 1930, Adolf Loos

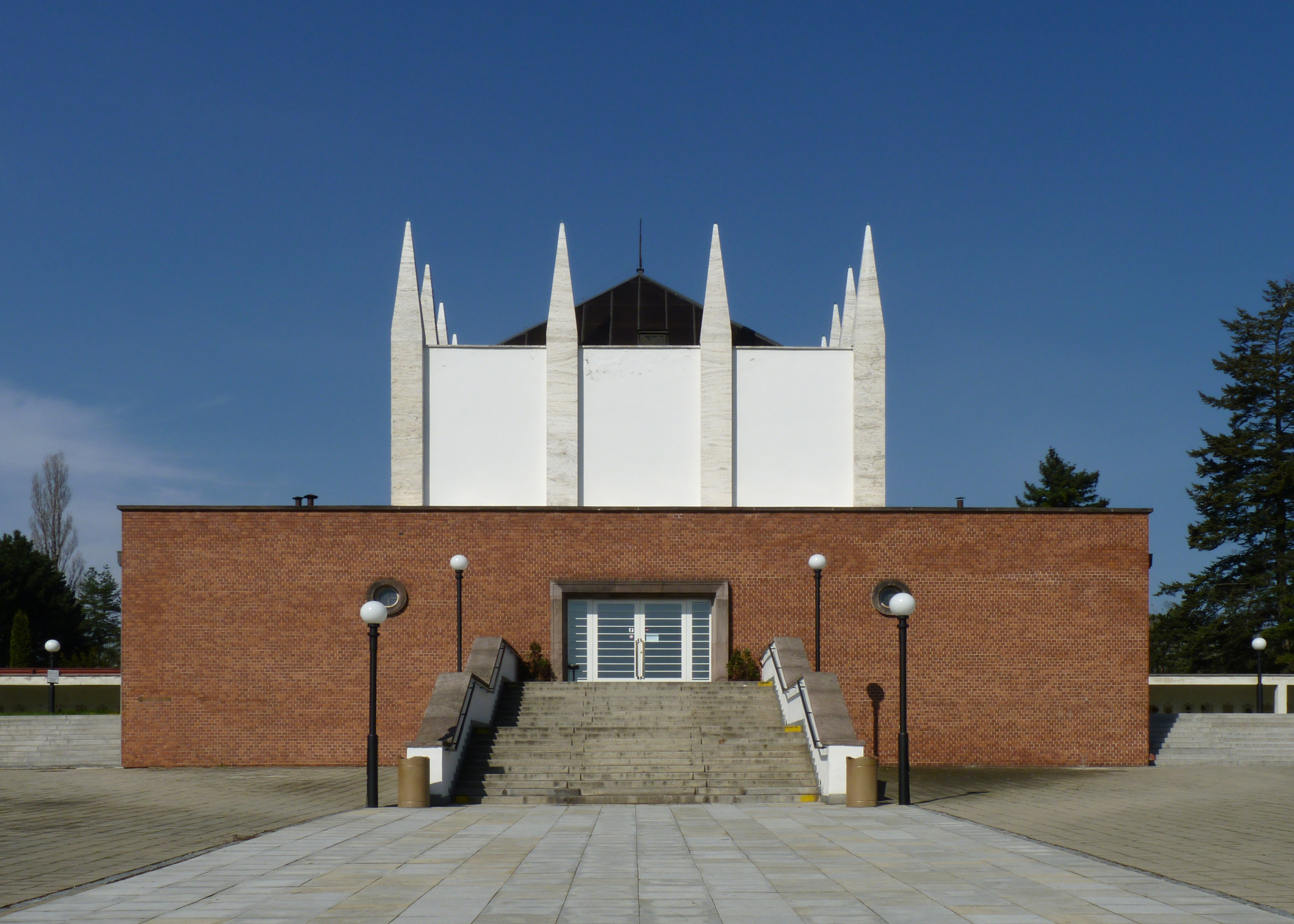
Brno Crematorium (Brno), 1930, Ernst Wiesner

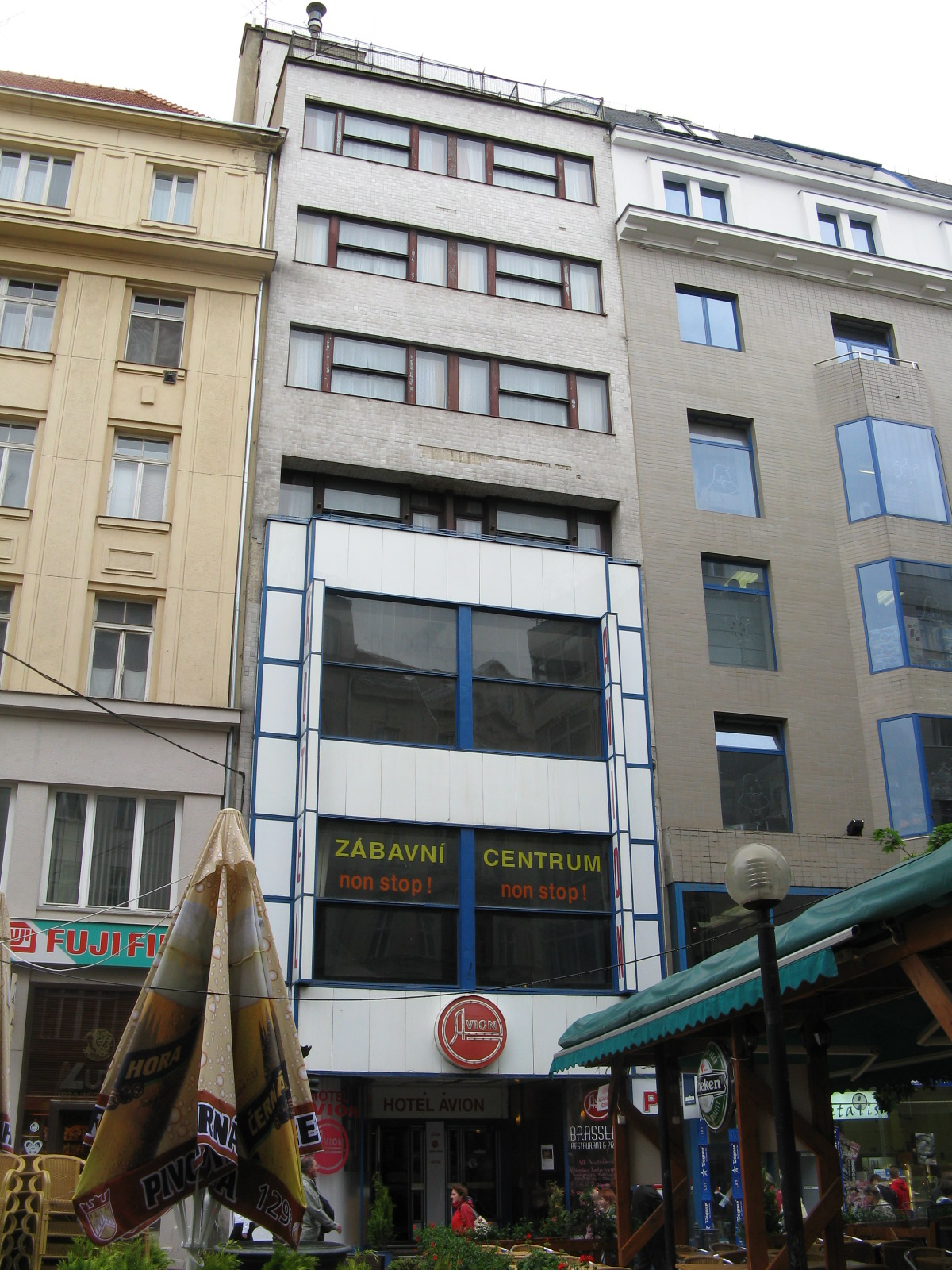
Hotel Avion (Brno), 1928, Bohuslav Fuchs

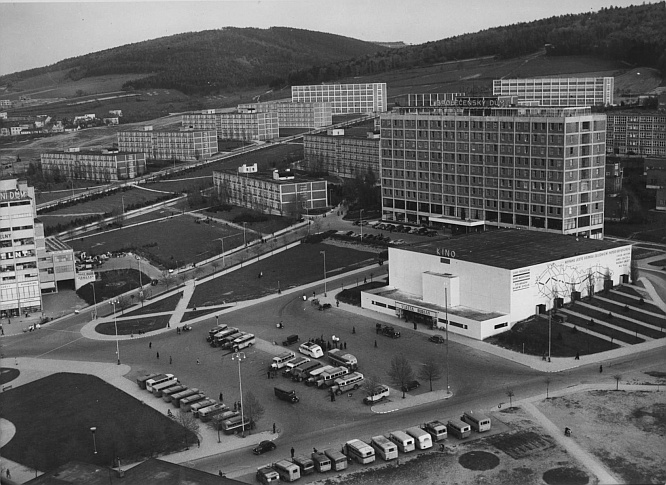
Zlín, factory city built by the Bata Company

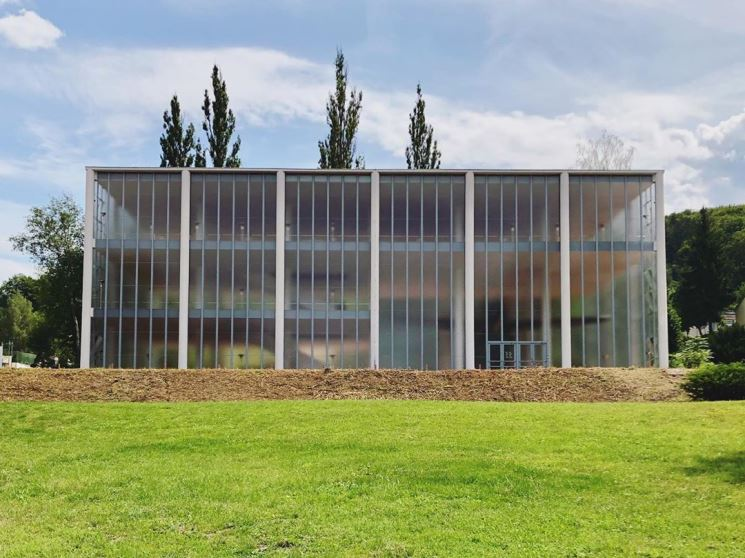
Tomas Bata Memorial (Zlín), 1933, František Lydie Gahura

=== Germany ===
German modern architects had been working in a style using principles associated with Functionalism from the 1910s onward; using angular geometric designs, glass, and unadorned facades. By the 1920s, this style came to prominence over competing styles such as Expressionism. The movement was known by several terms including Neue Sachlichkeit (New Sobriety, or New Objectivity) and Neues Bauen (New Building).

=== Nordic "funkis" ===
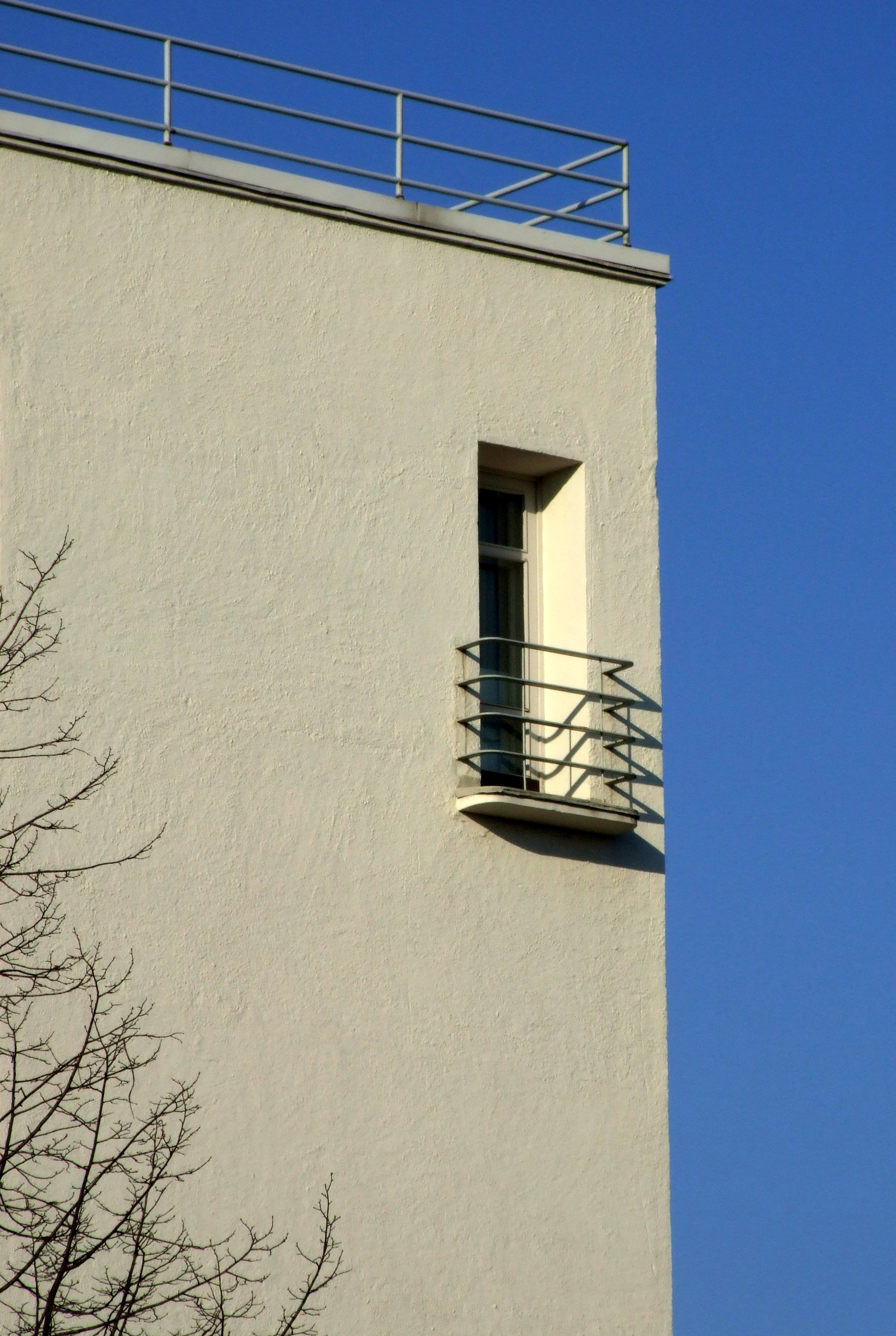
Typical railing, flat roof, stucco and colour detail in Nordic funkis (SOK warehouse and offices, 1938, Finland)

In Scandinavia and Finland, the international movement and ideas of modernist architecture became widely known among architects at the 1930 Stockholm Exhibition, under the guidance of director and Swedish architect Gunnar Asplund. Enthusiastic architects collected their ideas and inspirations in the manifesto acceptera and in the years thereafter, a functionalist architecture emerged throughout Scandinavia. The genre involves some peculiar features unique to Scandinavia and it is often referred to as "funkis", to distinguish it from functionalism in general. Some of the common features are flat roofing, stuccoed walls, architectural glazing and well-lit rooms, an industrial expression and nautical-inspired details, including round windows. The global stock market crisis and economic meltdown in 1929, instigated the needs to use affordable materials, such as brick and concrete, and to build quickly and efficiently. These needs became another signature of the Nordic version of functionalist architecture, in particular in buildings from the 1930s, and carried over into modernist architecture when industrial serial production became much more prevalent after World War II.

As most architectural styles, Nordic funkis was international in its scope and several architects designed Nordic funkis buildings throughout the region. Some of the most active architects working internationally with this style, includes Edvard Heiberg, Arne Jacobsen and Alvar Aalto. Nordic funkis features prominently in Scandinavian urban architecture, as the need for urban housing and new institutions for the growing welfare states exploded after World War II. Funkis had its heyday in the 1930s and 1940s, but functionalist architecture continued to be built long into the 1960s. These later structures, however, tend to be categorized as modernism in a Nordic context.

==== Denmark ====
Vilhelm Lauritzen, Arne Jacobsen and C.F. Møller were among the most active and influential Danish architects of the new functionalist ideas and Arne Jacobsen, Poul Kjærholm, Kaare Klint, and others, extended the new approach to design in general, most notably furniture which evolved to become Danish modern. Some Danish designers and artists who did not work as architects are sometimes also included in the Danish functionalist movement, such as Finn Juhl, Louis Poulsen and Poul Henningsen. In Denmark, bricks were largely preferred over reinforced concrete as construction material, and this included funkis buildings. Apart from institutions and apartment blocks, more than 100,000 single-family funkis houses were built in the years 1925–1945. However, the truly dedicated funkis design was often approached with caution. Many residential buildings only included some signature funkis elements such as round windows, corner windows or architectural glazing to signal modernity while not provoking conservative traditionalists too much. This branch of restrained approach to the funkis design created the Danish version of the bungalow building.

Fine examples of Danish functionalist architecture are the now listed Kastrup Airport's Vilhelm Lauritzen's Terminal ( 1939), Aarhus University (by C. F. Møller et al.) and Aarhus City Hall (by Arne Jacobsen et al.), all including furniture and lamps specially designed for these buildings in the functionalist spirit. The largest functionalist complex in the Nordic countries is the 30,000-sq. m. residential compound of Hostrups Have in Copenhagen.

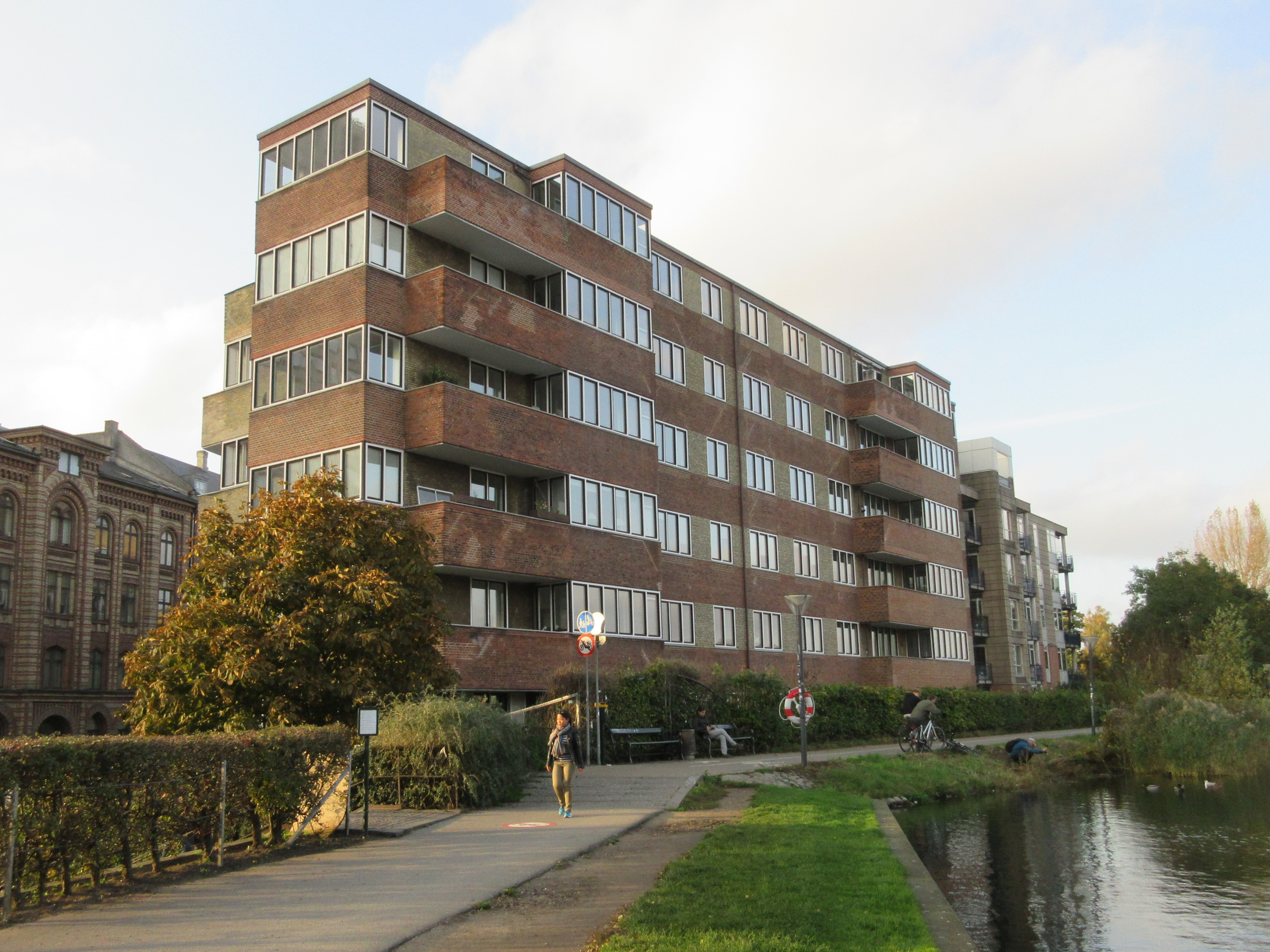
Vodroffsvej 2, Copenhagen (1929–30)

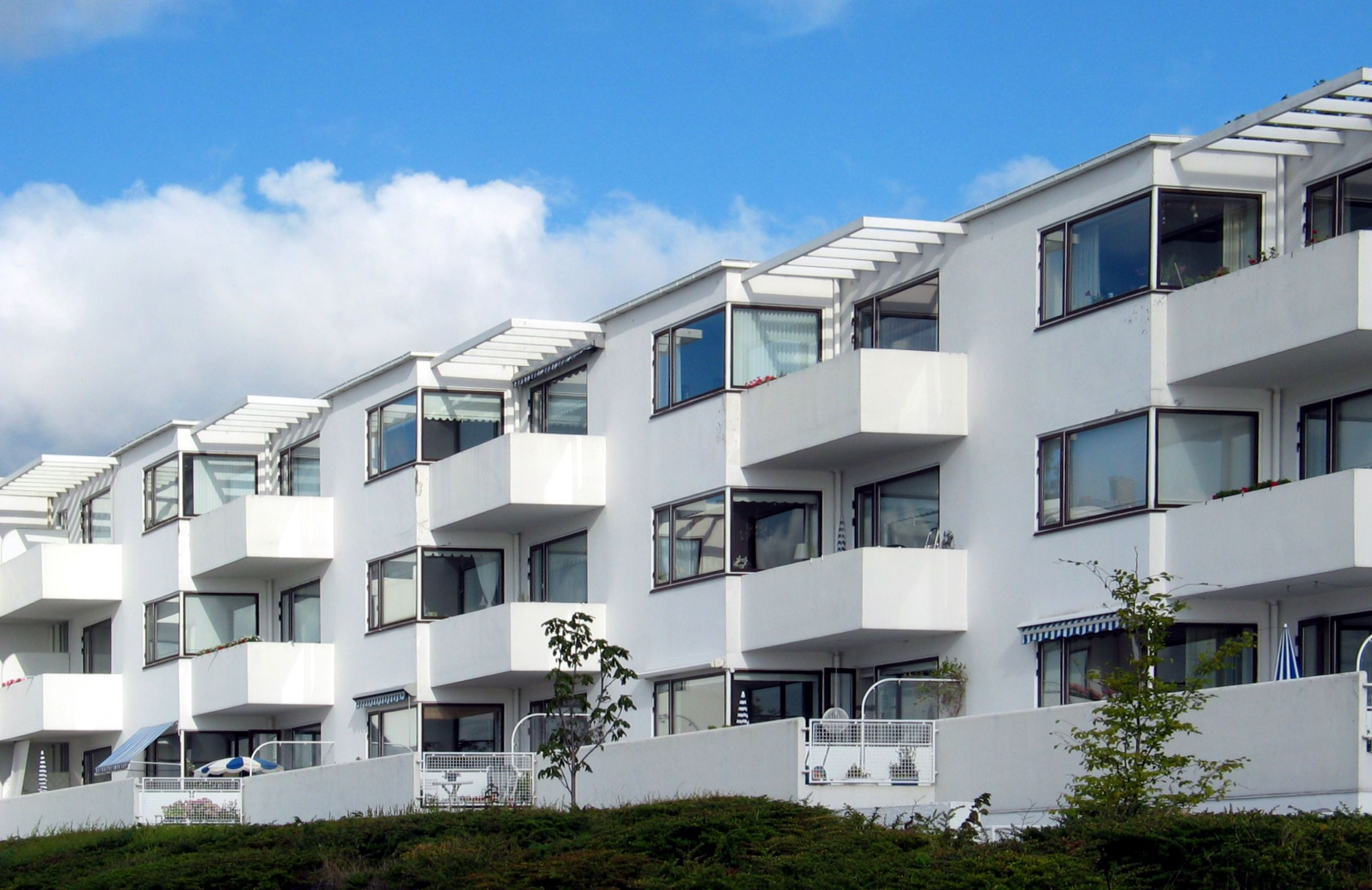
Bellavista (1934), Klampenborg

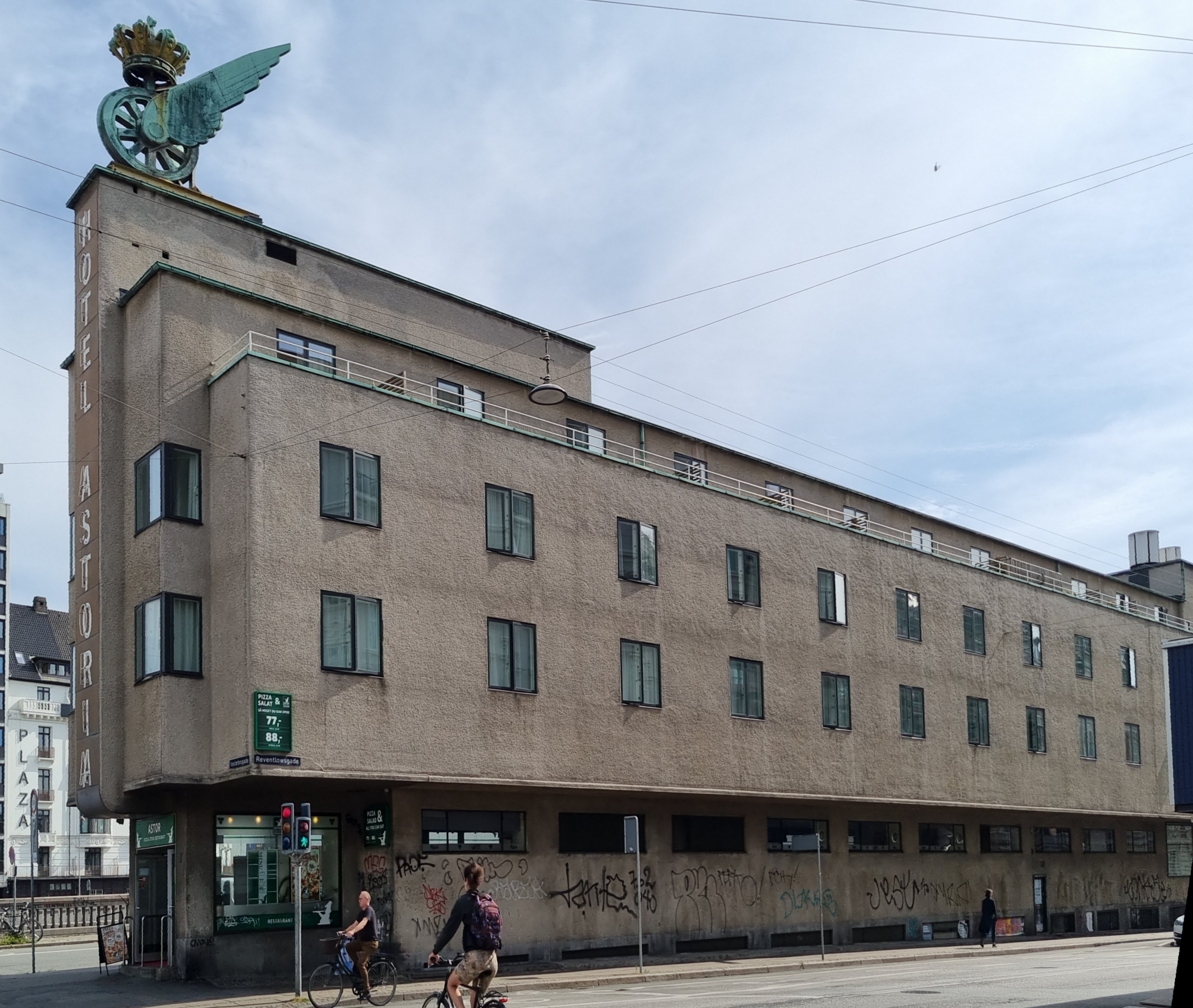
Hotel Astoria, Copenhagen (1935)

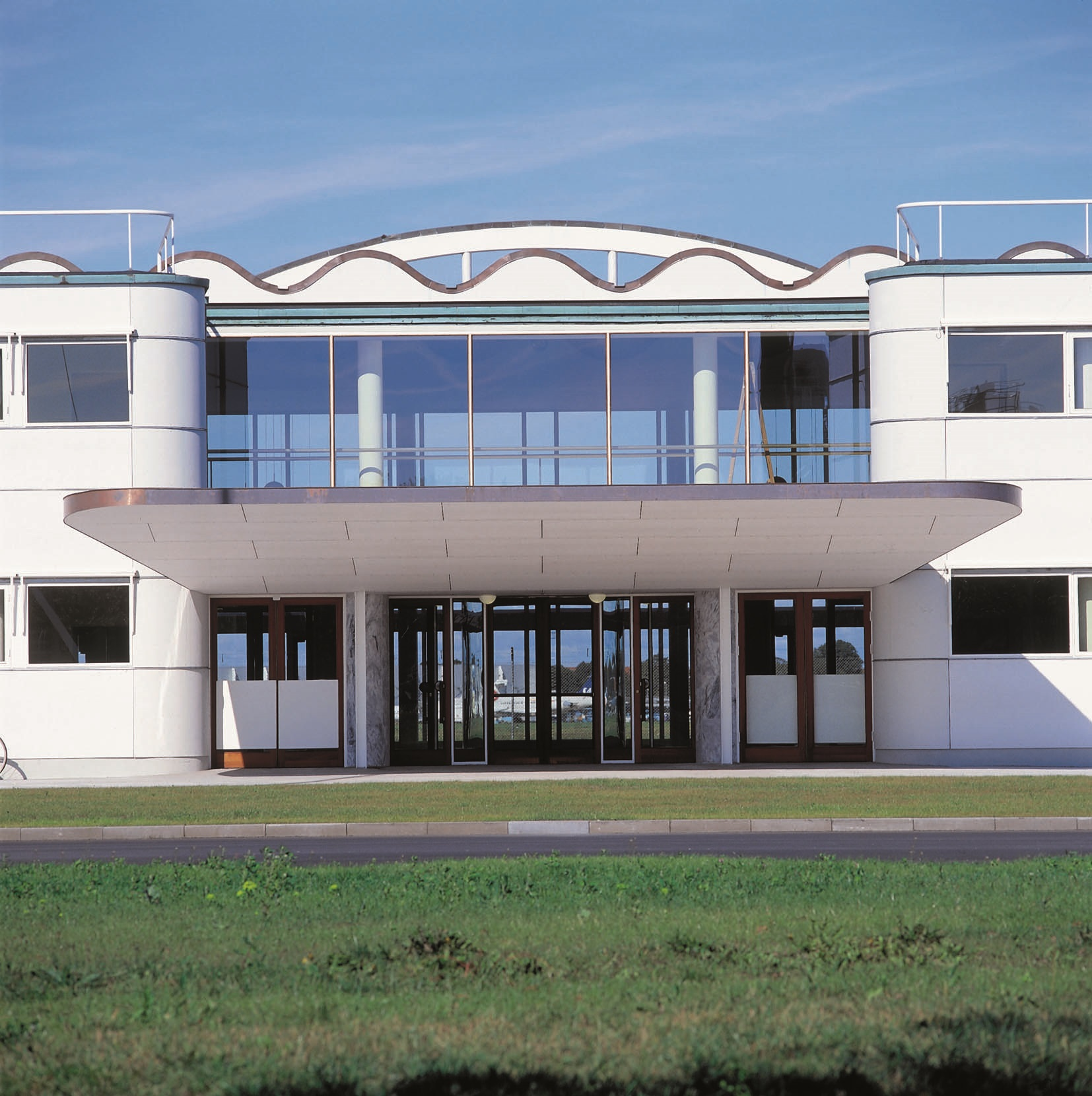
Vilhelm Lauritzen's Terminal, Copenhagen (1939),

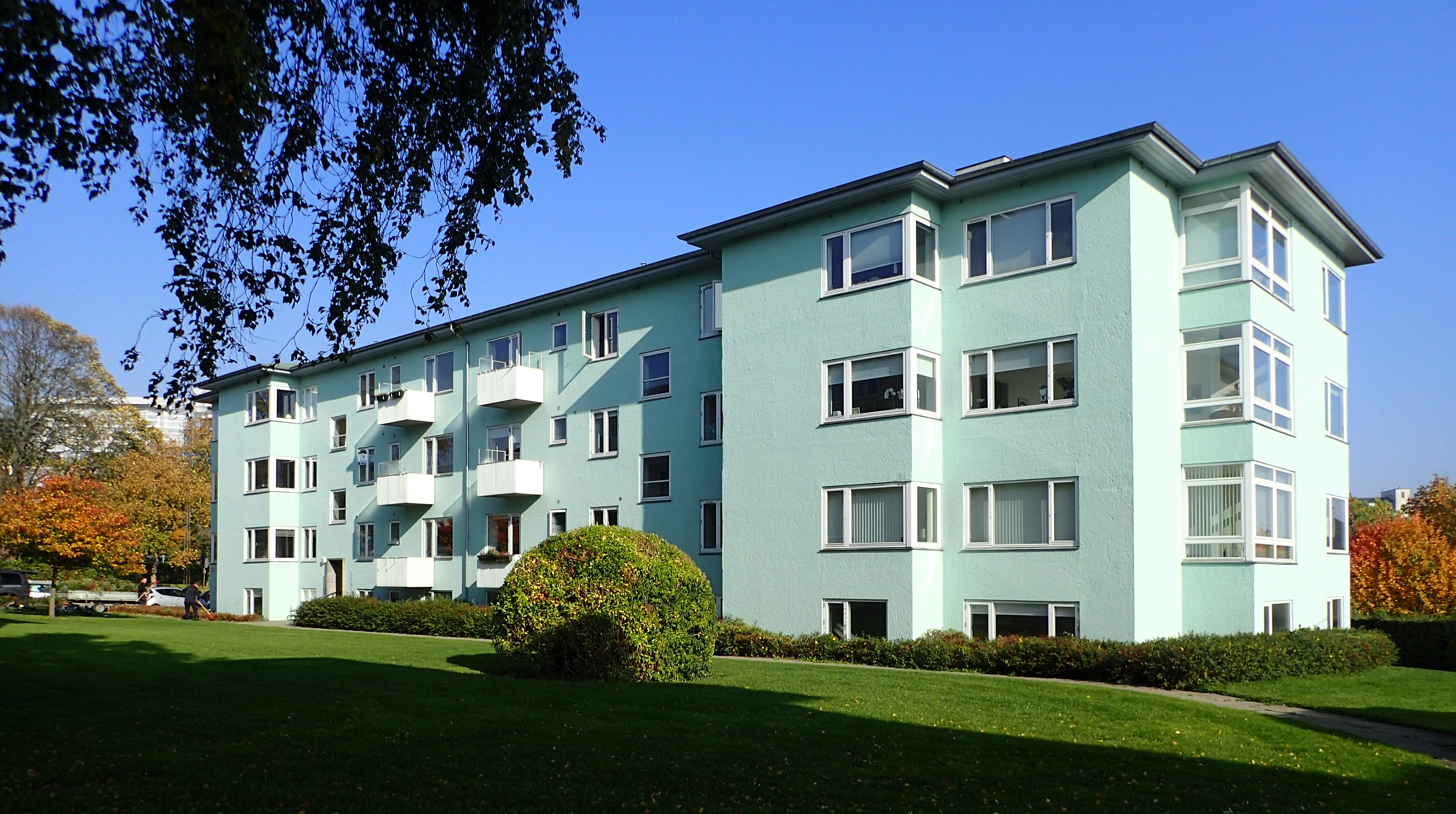
Strandparken (1938), Aarhus. Typical pastel colour for stuccoed funkis.

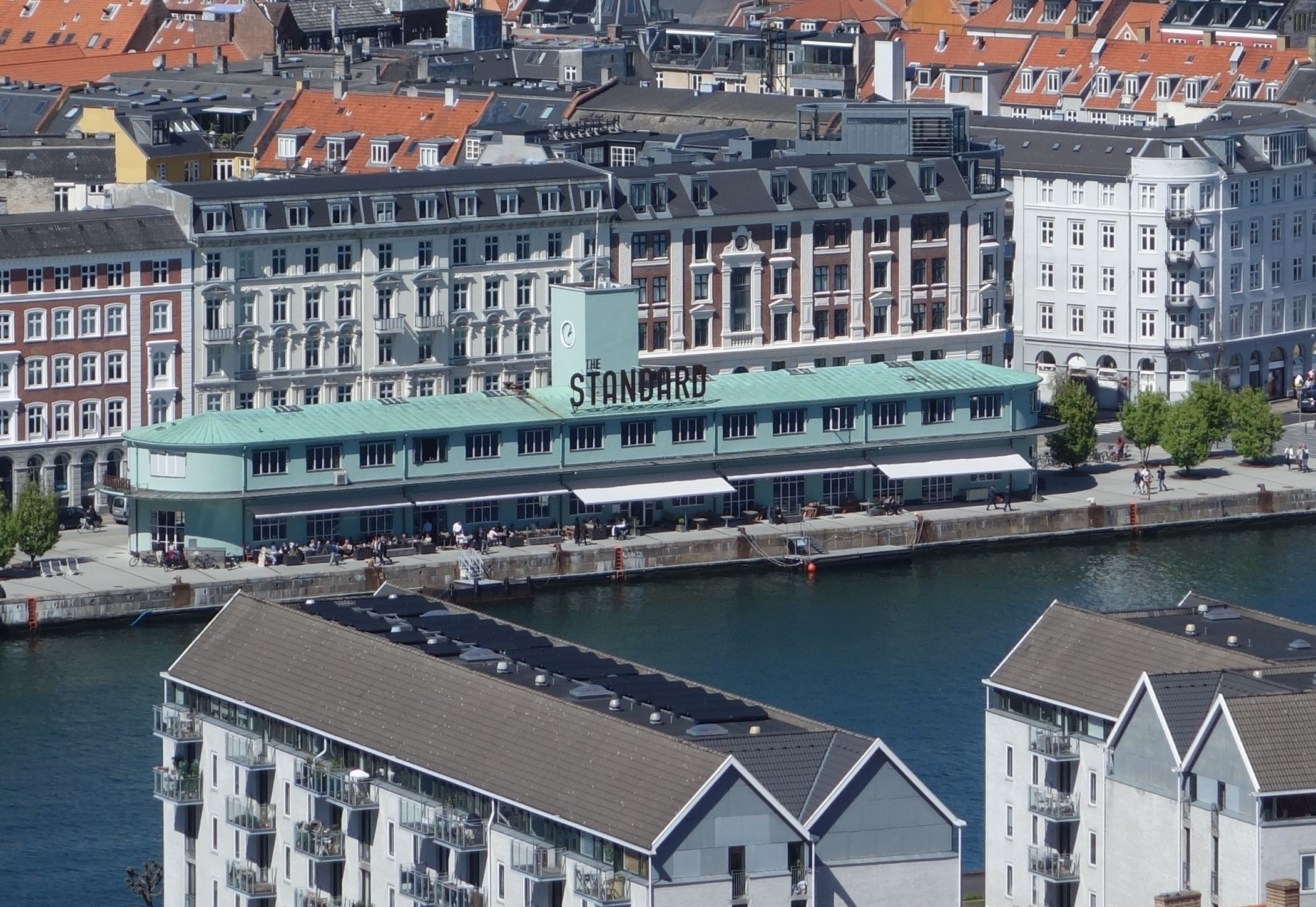
The Standard (1937), Copenhagen. Former custom house.

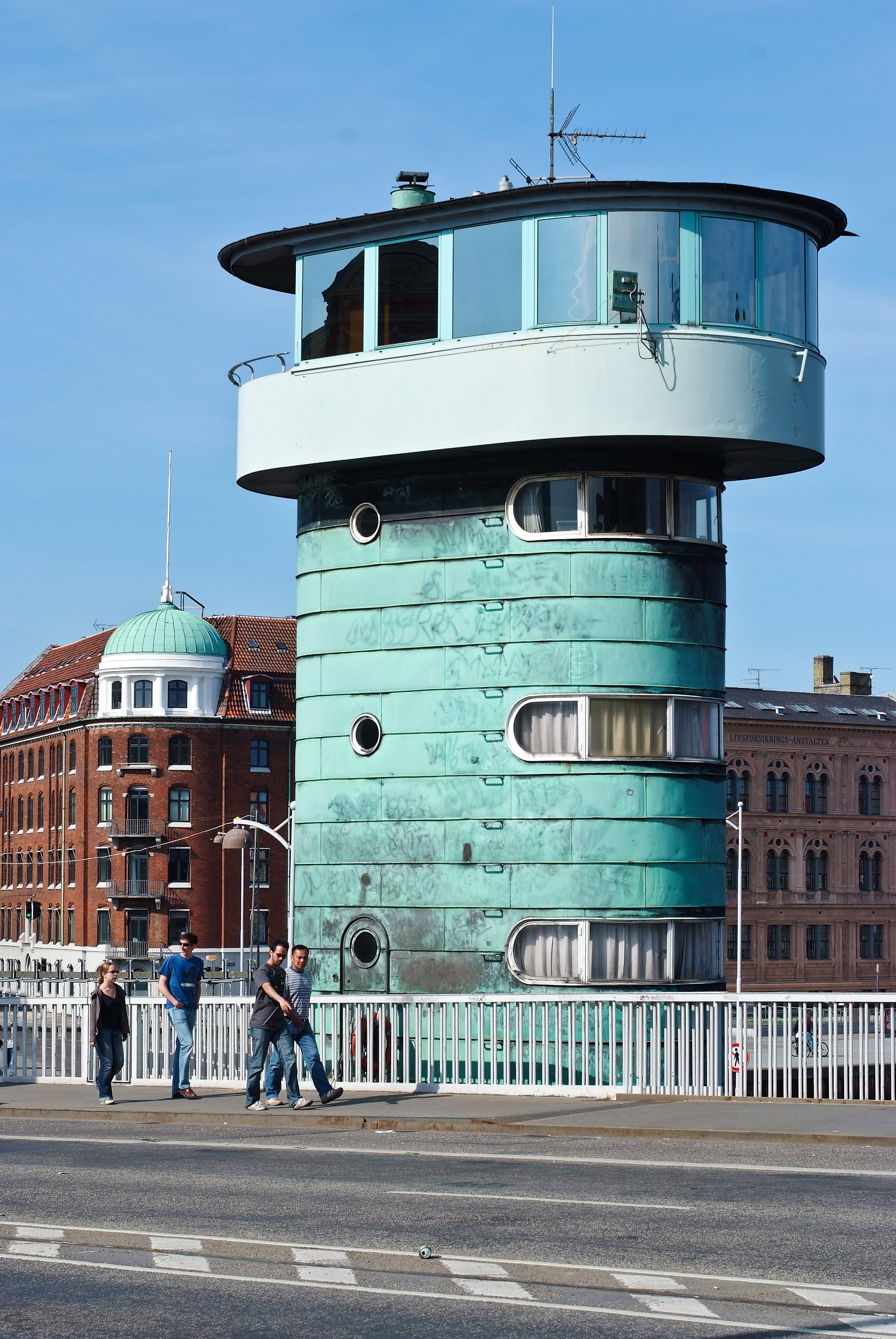
Knippelsbro bridge (1935), Copenhagen

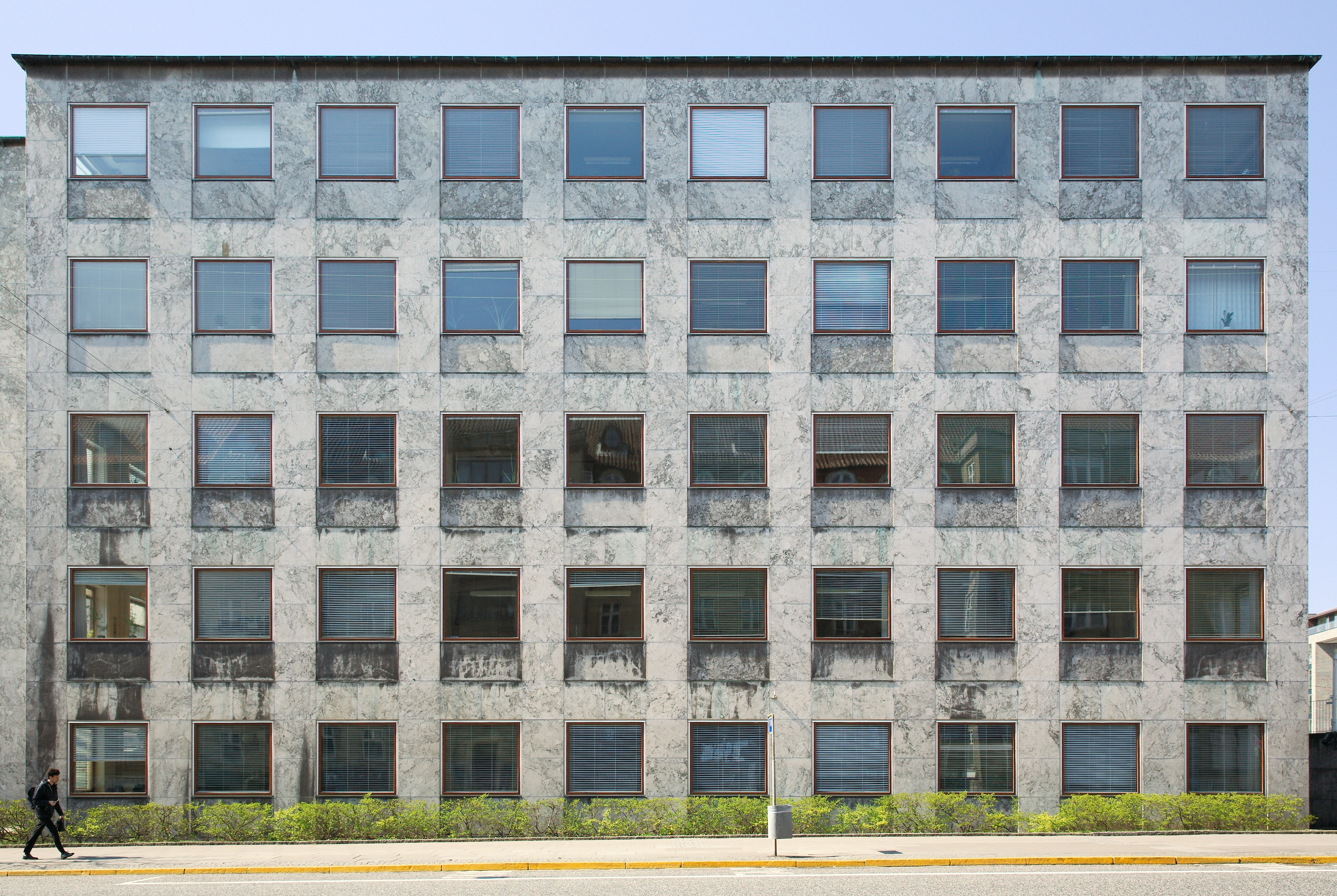
Aarhus City Hall (1941), Aarhus. Marble facade.

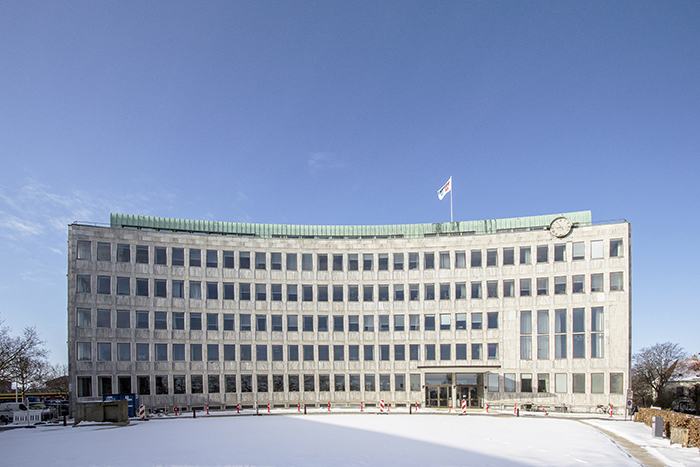
Lyngby City Hall (1941), Lyngby

==== Finland ====
Some of the most prolific and notable architects in Finland, working in the funkis style, includes Alvar Aalto and Erik Bryggman who were both engaged from the very start in the 1930s. The Turku region pioneered this new style and the journal Arkkitehti mediated and discussed functionalism in a Finnish context. Many of the first buildings in the funkis style were industrial structures, institutions and offices but spread to other kinds of structures such as residential buildings, individual housing and churches. The functionalist design also spread to interior designs and furniture as exemplified by the iconic Paimio Sanatorium, designed in 1929 and built in 1933.

Aalto introduced standardised, precast concrete elements as early as the late 1920s, when he designed residential buildings in Turku. This technique became a cornerstone of later developments in modernist architecture after World War II, especially in the 1950s and 1960s. He also introduced serial produced wooden housing.

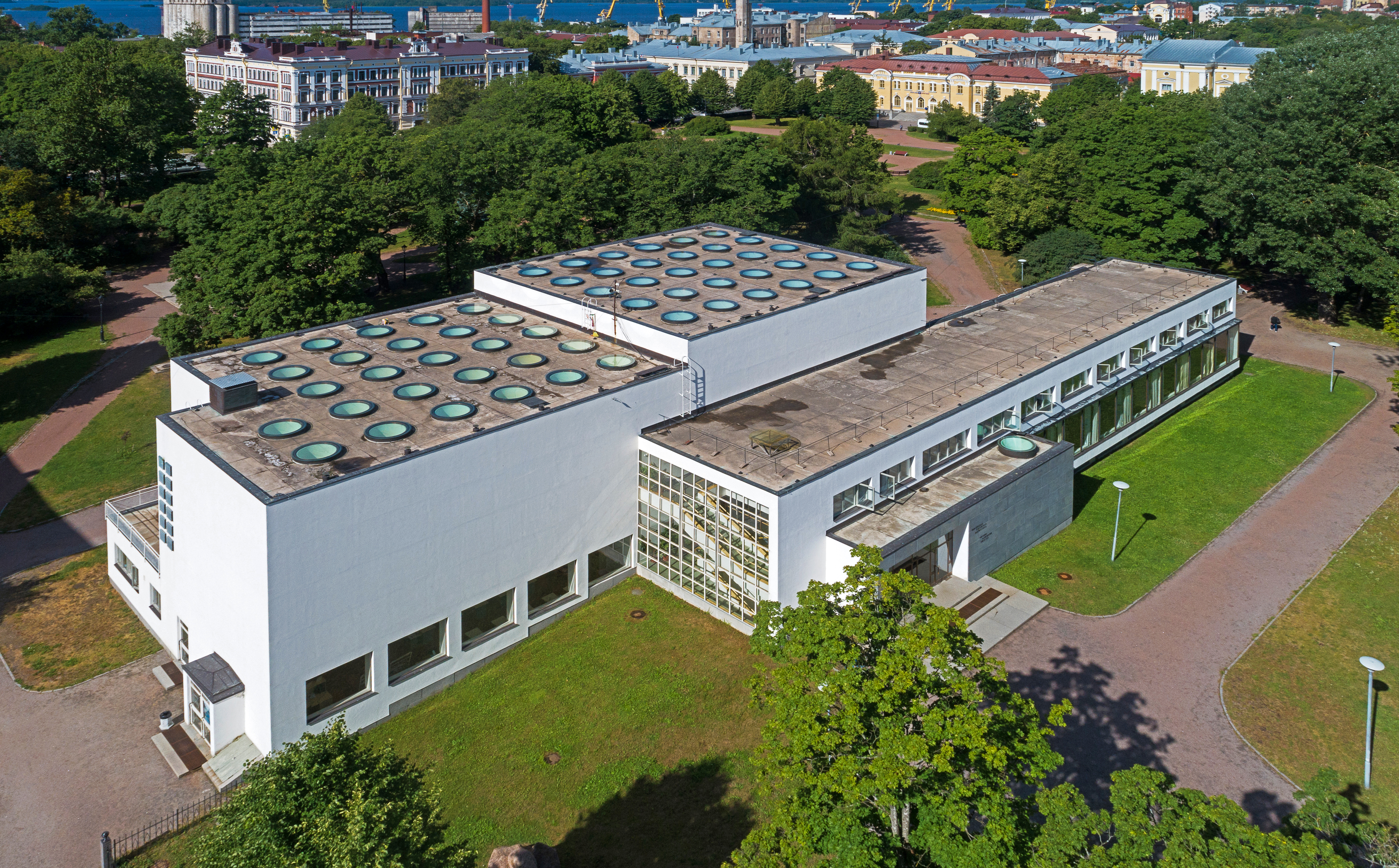
Viipuri Library (1927) in Vyborg

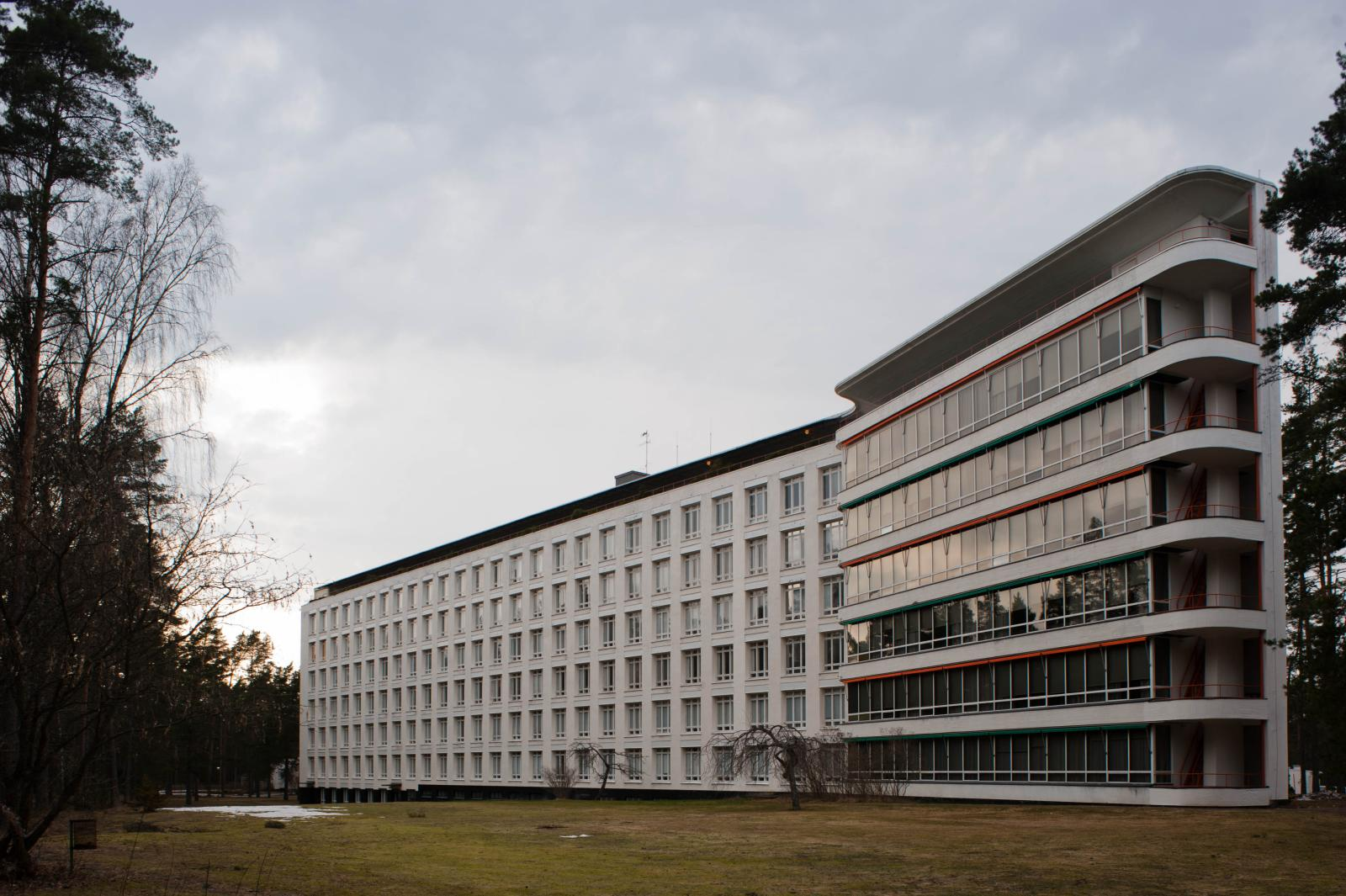
Paimio Sanatorium (1931) in Paimio

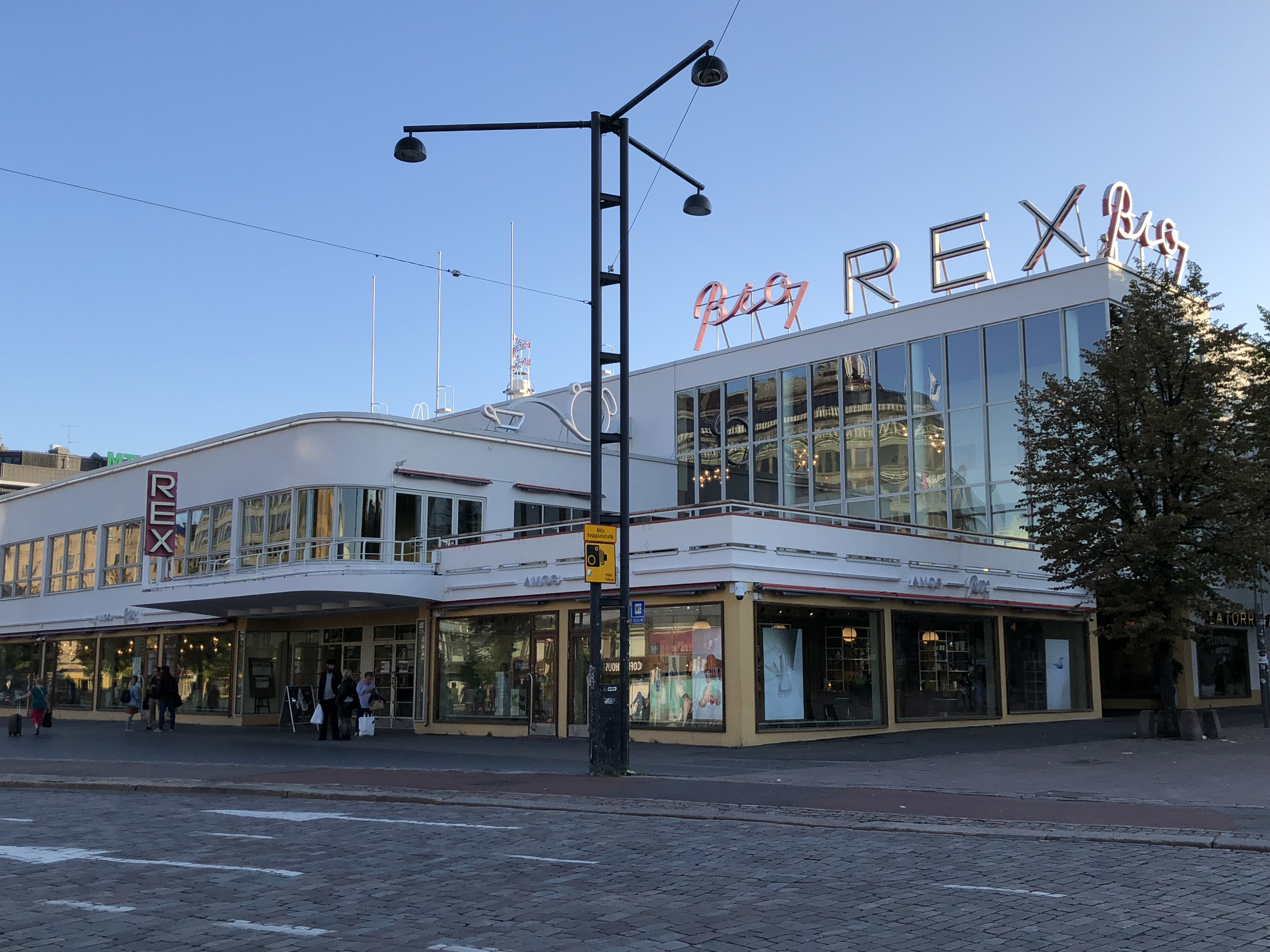
Lasipalatsi (1936) in Helsinki

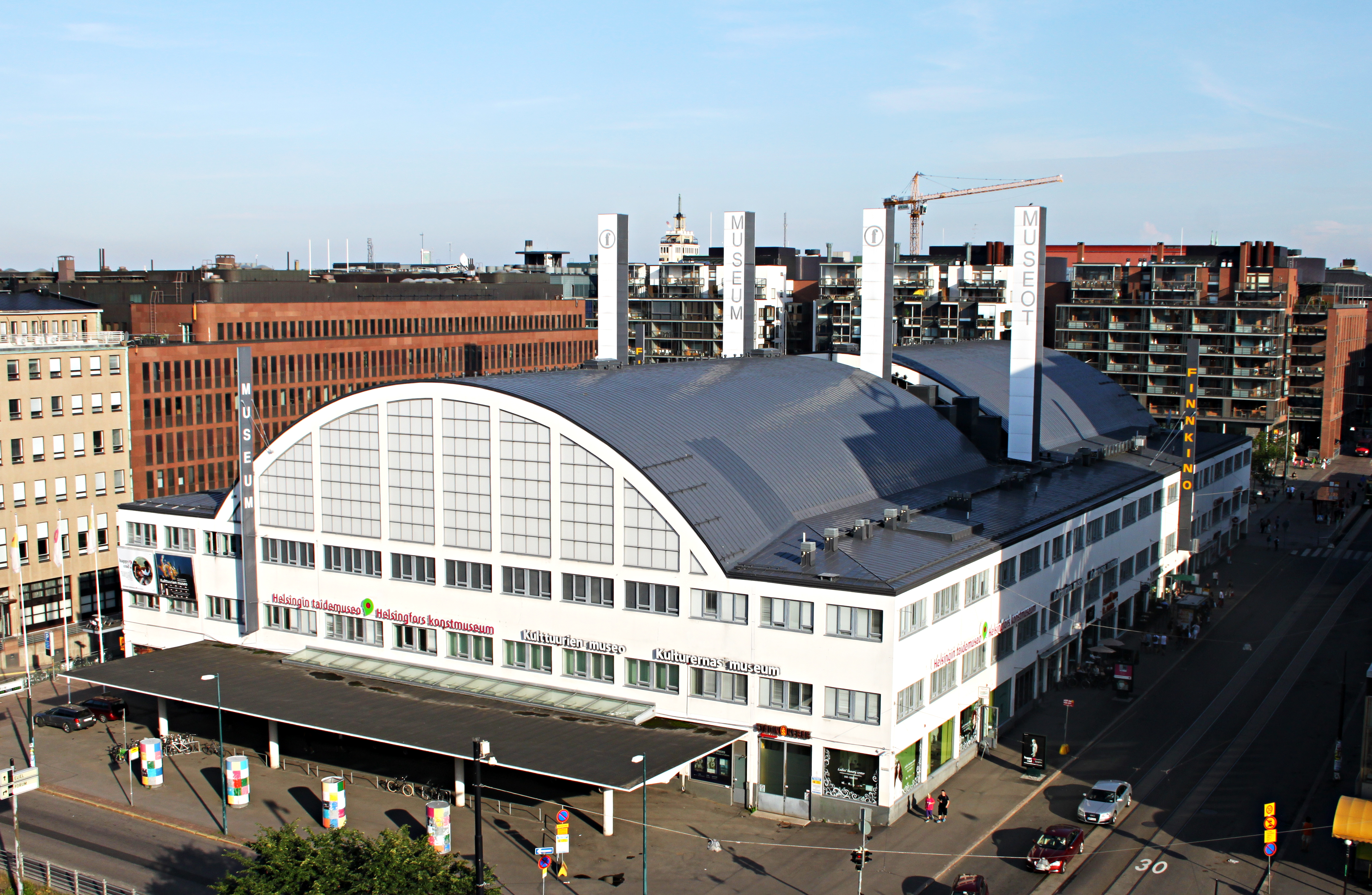
Tennispalatsi (1937) in Helsinki

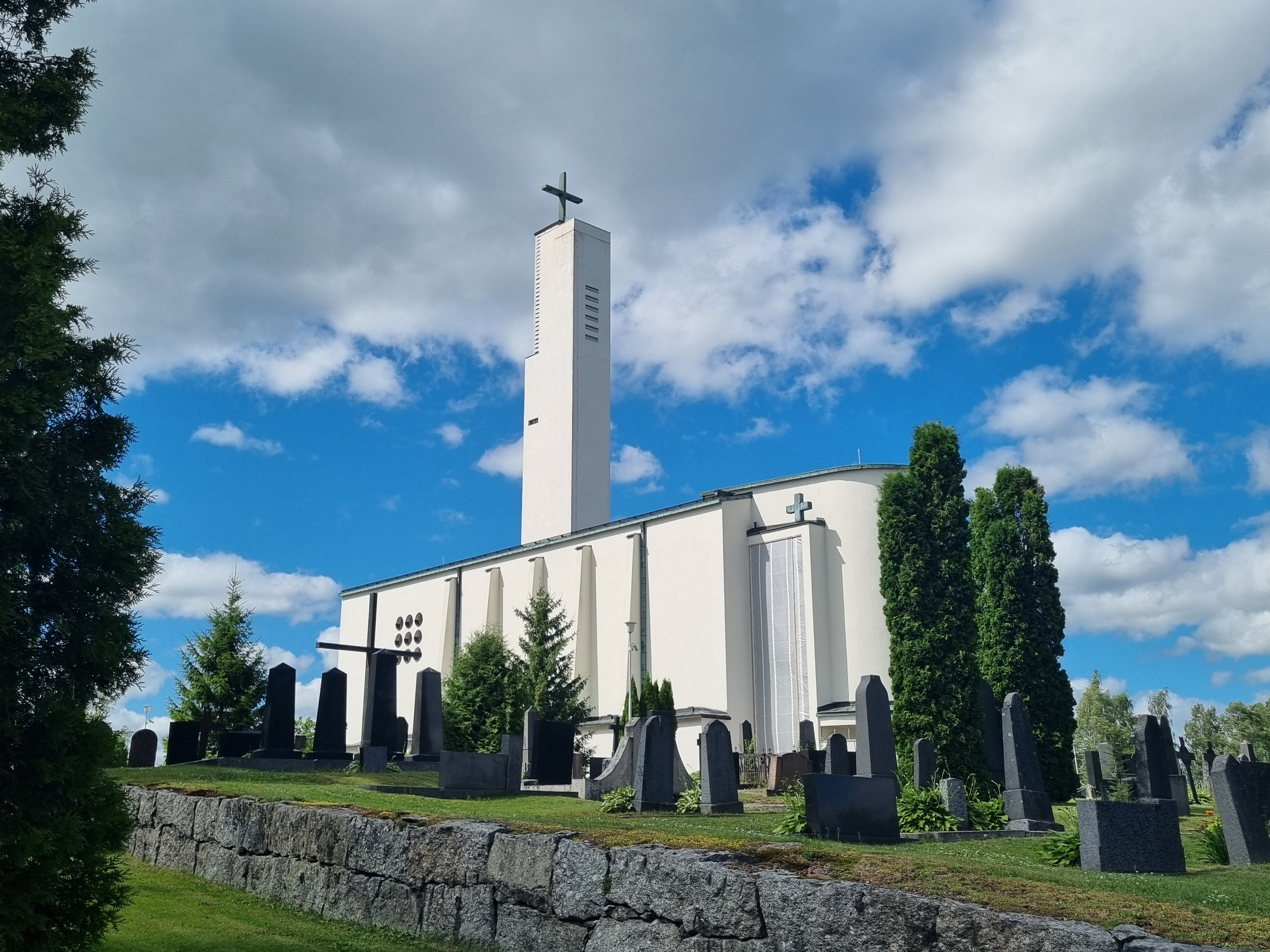
Lutheran Church (1937) in Nakkila

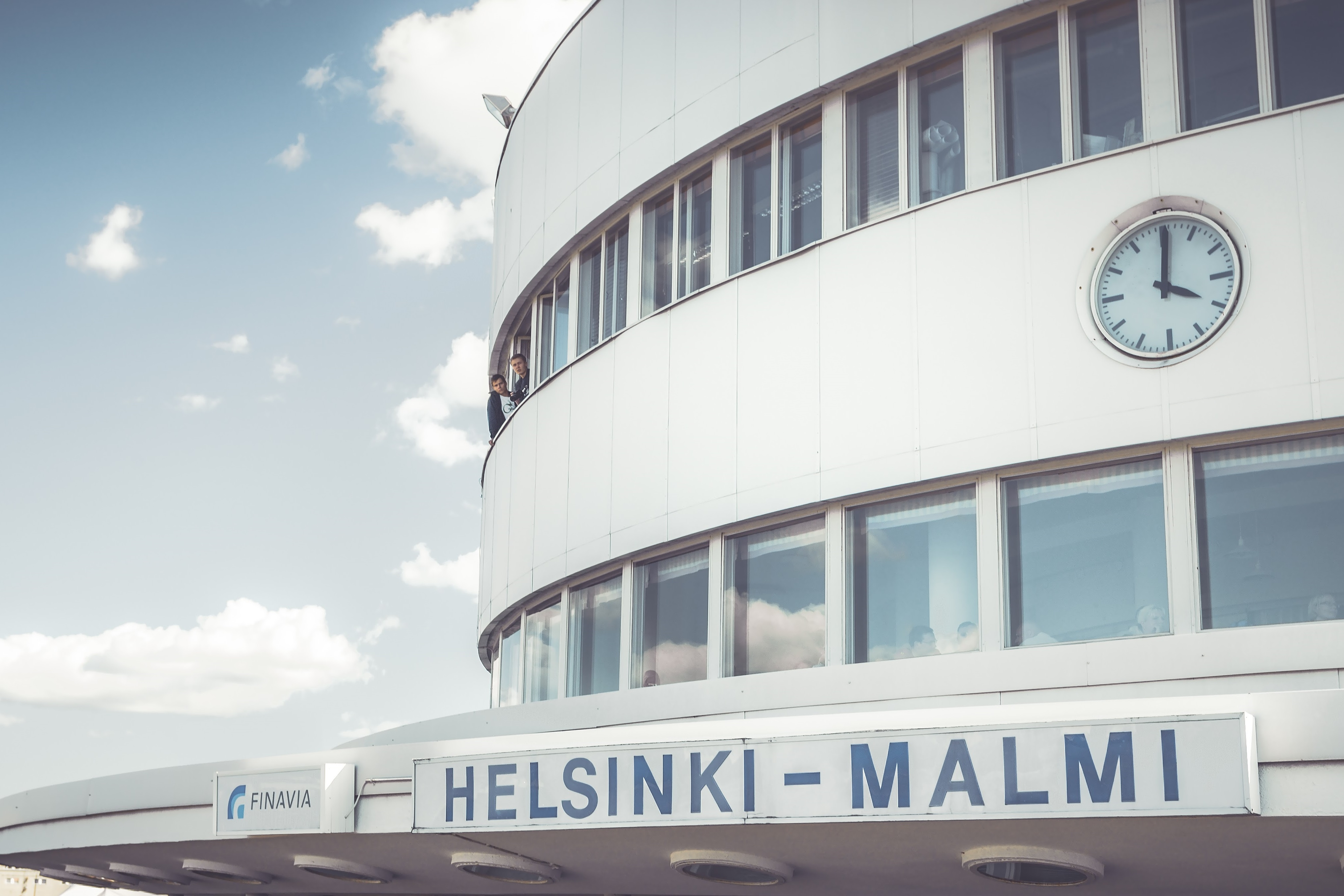
Helsinki-Malmi Airport Terminal (1938)

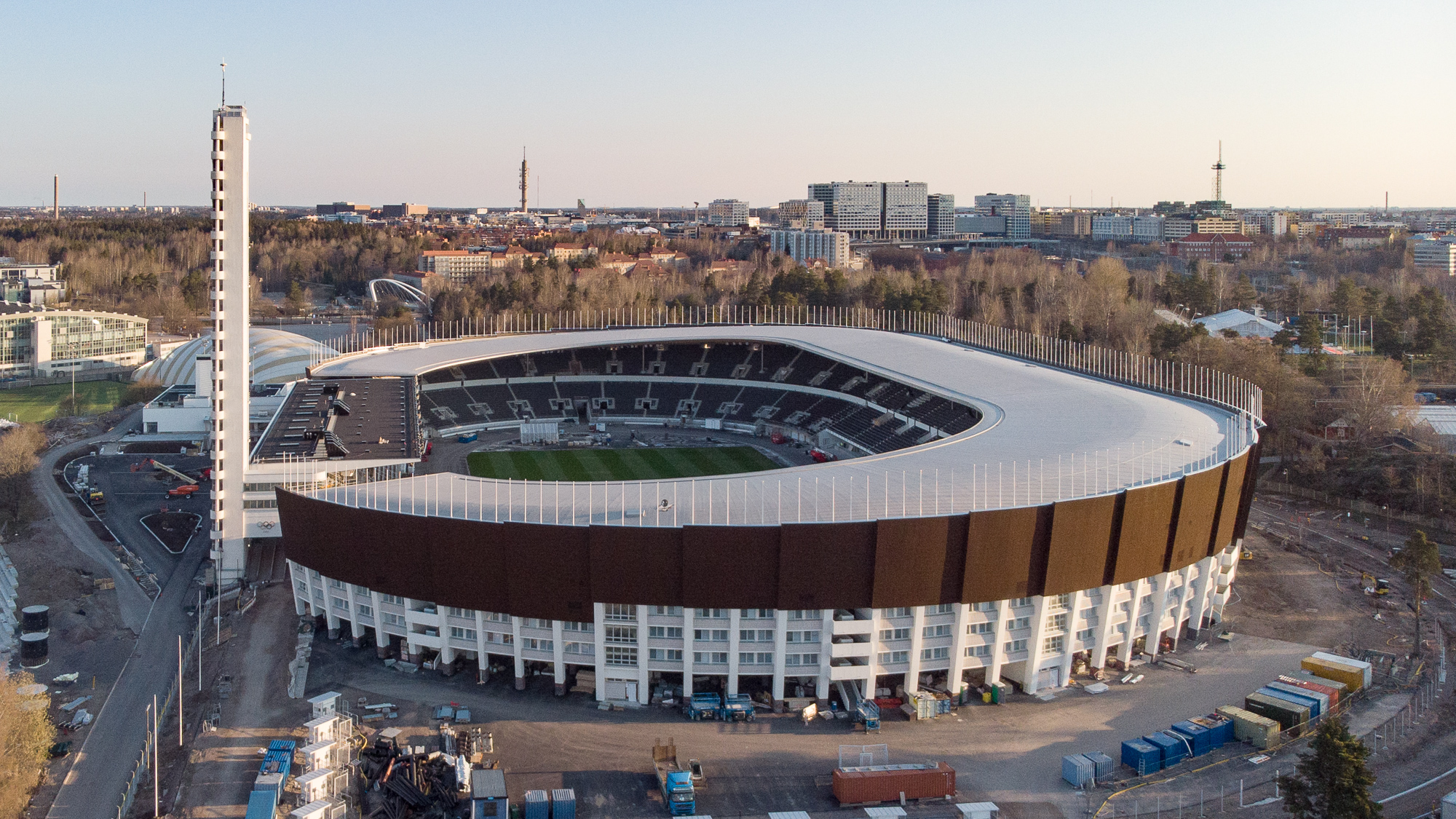
Helsinki Olympic Stadium (1938)

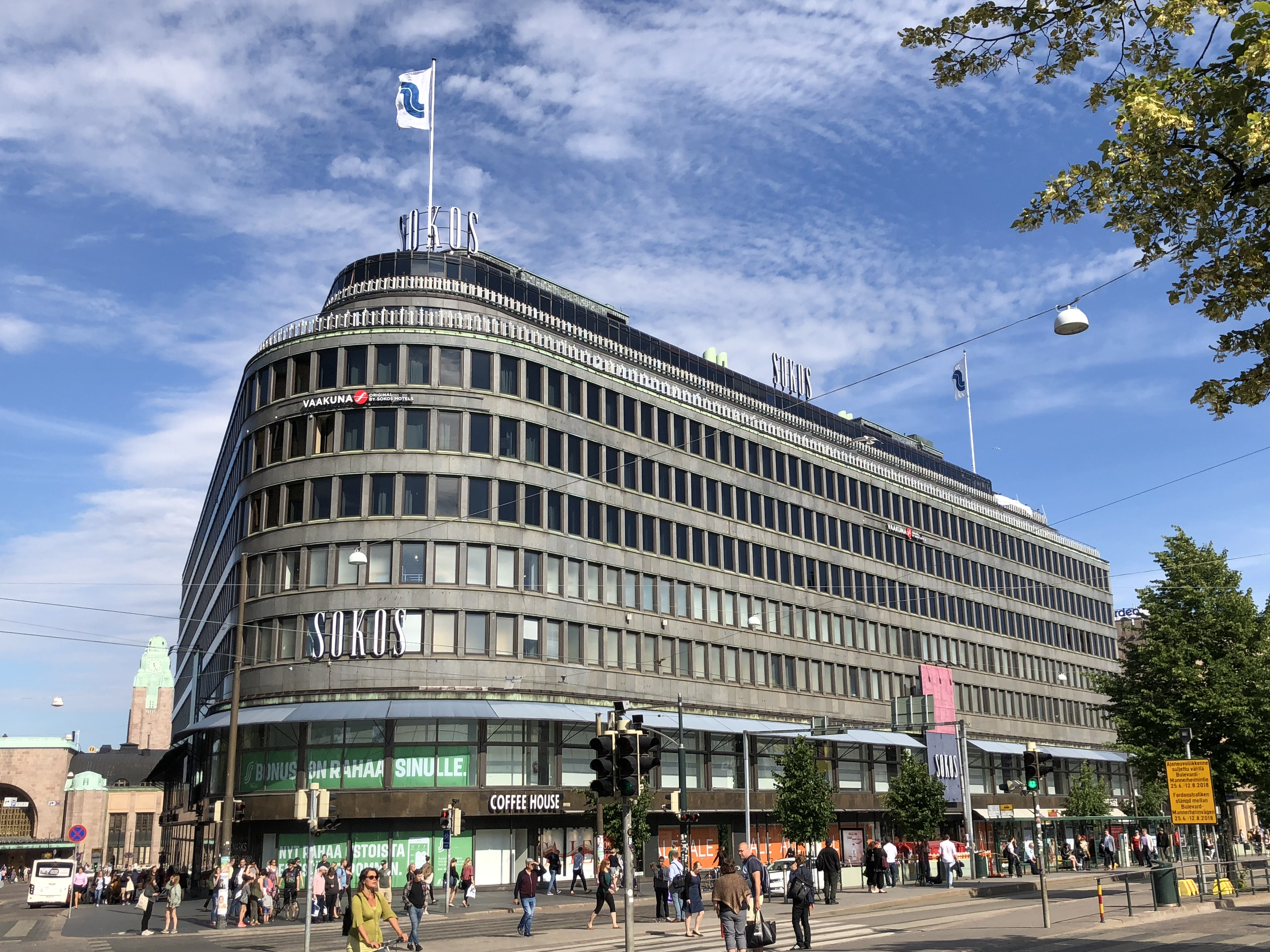
Hotel Vaakuna (1940) in Helsinki

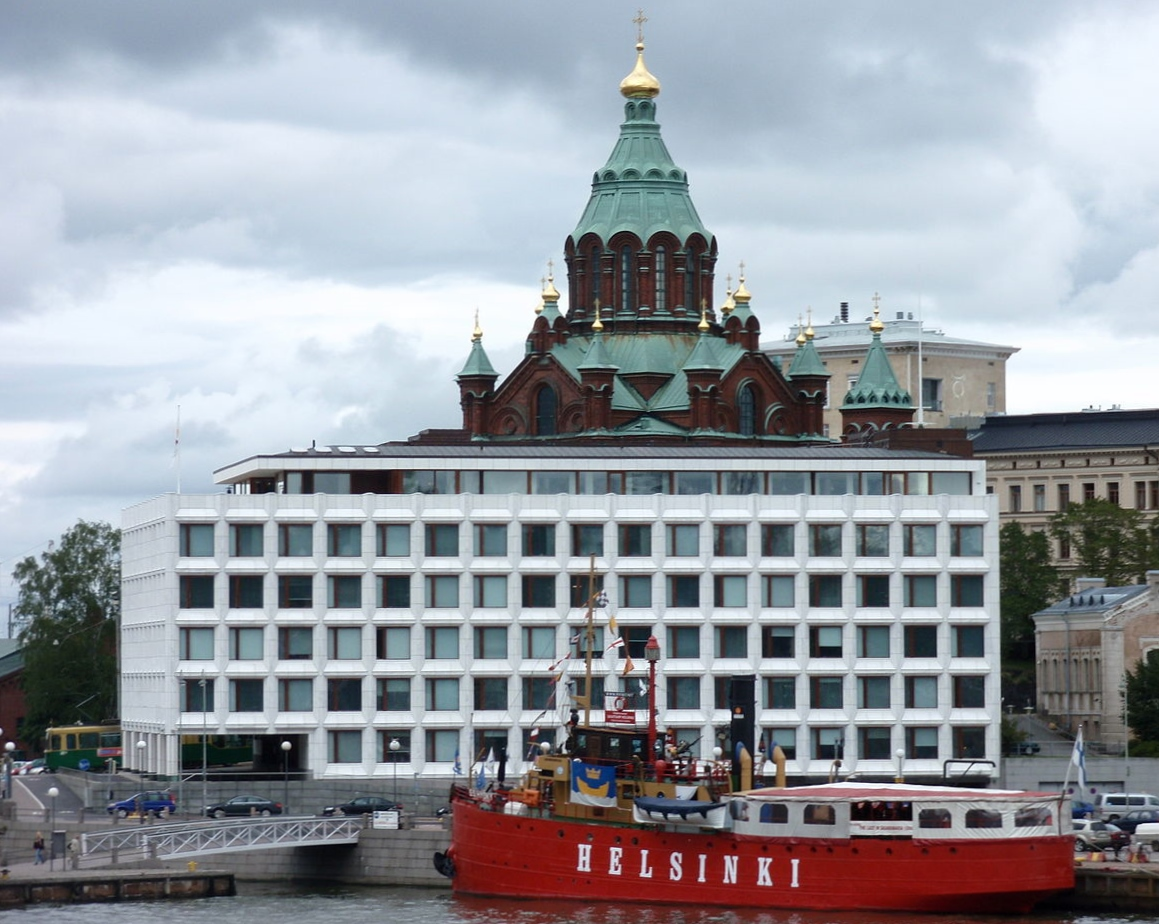
Stora Enso head office (1962) in Helsinki

=== Poland ===
Interbellum avant-garde Polish architects in the years 1918–1939 made a notable impact in the legacy of European modern architecture and functionalism. A lot of Polish architects were fascinated by Le Corbusier like his Polish students and coworkers Jerzy Sołtan, Aleksander Kujawski (both co-authors of Unité d'habitation in Marseille) and his coworkers Helena Syrkus (Le Corbusier's companion on board of the S.S. Patris, an ocean liner journeying from Marseille to Athens in 1933 during the CIAM IV), Roman Piotrowski and Maciej Nowicki. Le Corbusier said about Poles (When the Cathedrals Were White, Paris 1937) "Academism has sent down roots everywhere. Nevertheless, the Dutch are relatively free of bias. The Czechs believe in 'modern' and the Polish also." Other Polish architects like Stanisław Brukalski was meeting with Gerrit Rietveld and inspired by him and his neoplasticism. Only a few years after the construction of Rietveld Schröder House, Polish architect Stanisław Brukalski built his own house in Warsaw in 1929 supposedly inspired by Schröder House he had visited. His Polish example of the modern house was awarded bronze medal in Paris world expo in 1937. Just before the Second World War, it was fashionable to build in Poland a lot of large districts of luxury houses in neighbourhoods full of greenery for wealthy Poles like, for example, district Saska Kępa in Warsaw or district Kamienna Góra in seaport Gdynia. The most characteristic features in Polish functionalist architecture 1918–1939 were portholes, roof terraces and marble interiors.

Probably the most outstanding work of Polish functionalist architecture is the entire city of Gdynia, a modern Polish seaport established 1926 which in 2026 became a UNESCO World Heritage Site.

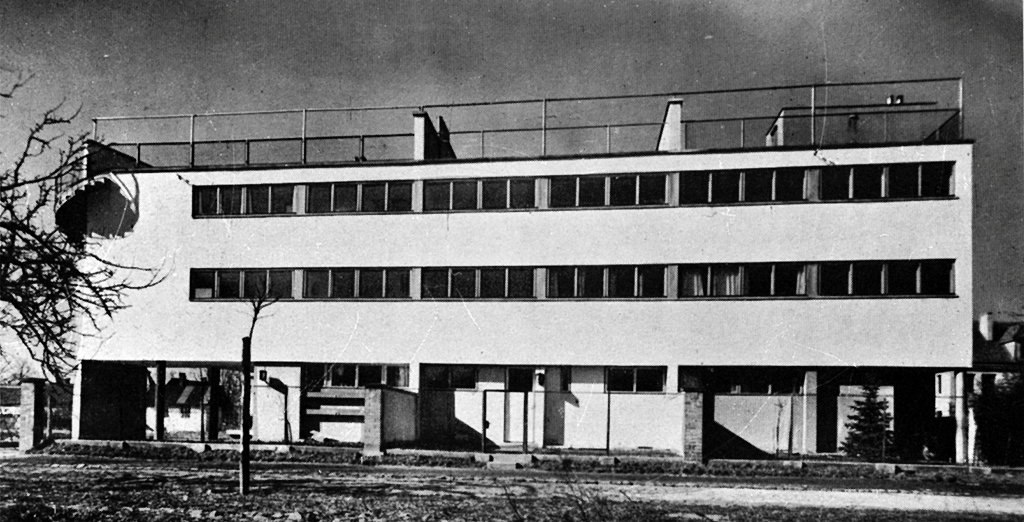
A villa with rooftop garden in Warsaw, by Bohdan Lachert (1929), inspired by the form of an ocean liner.

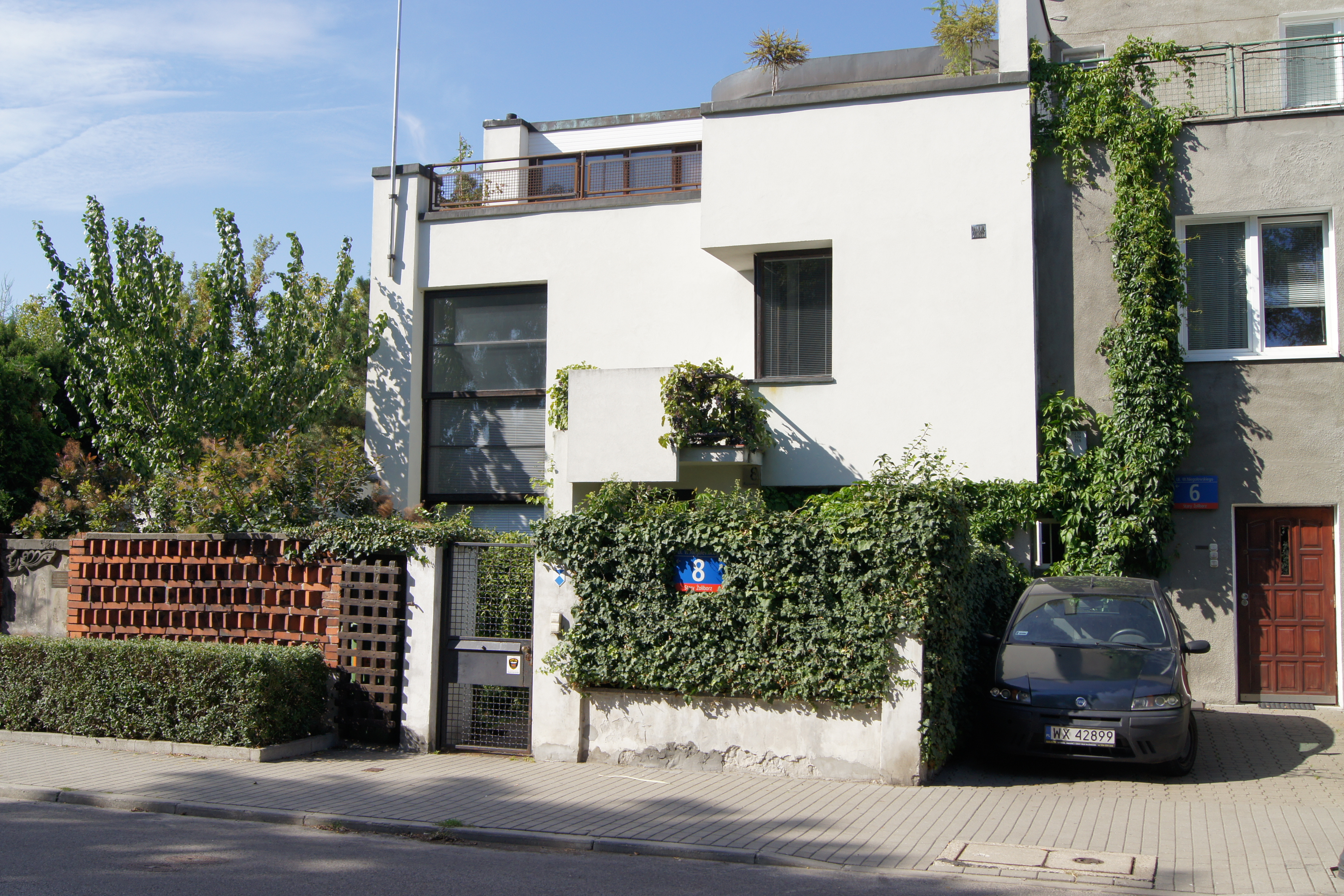
Stanisław Brukalski's villa with a roof terrace (1929) in Warsaw

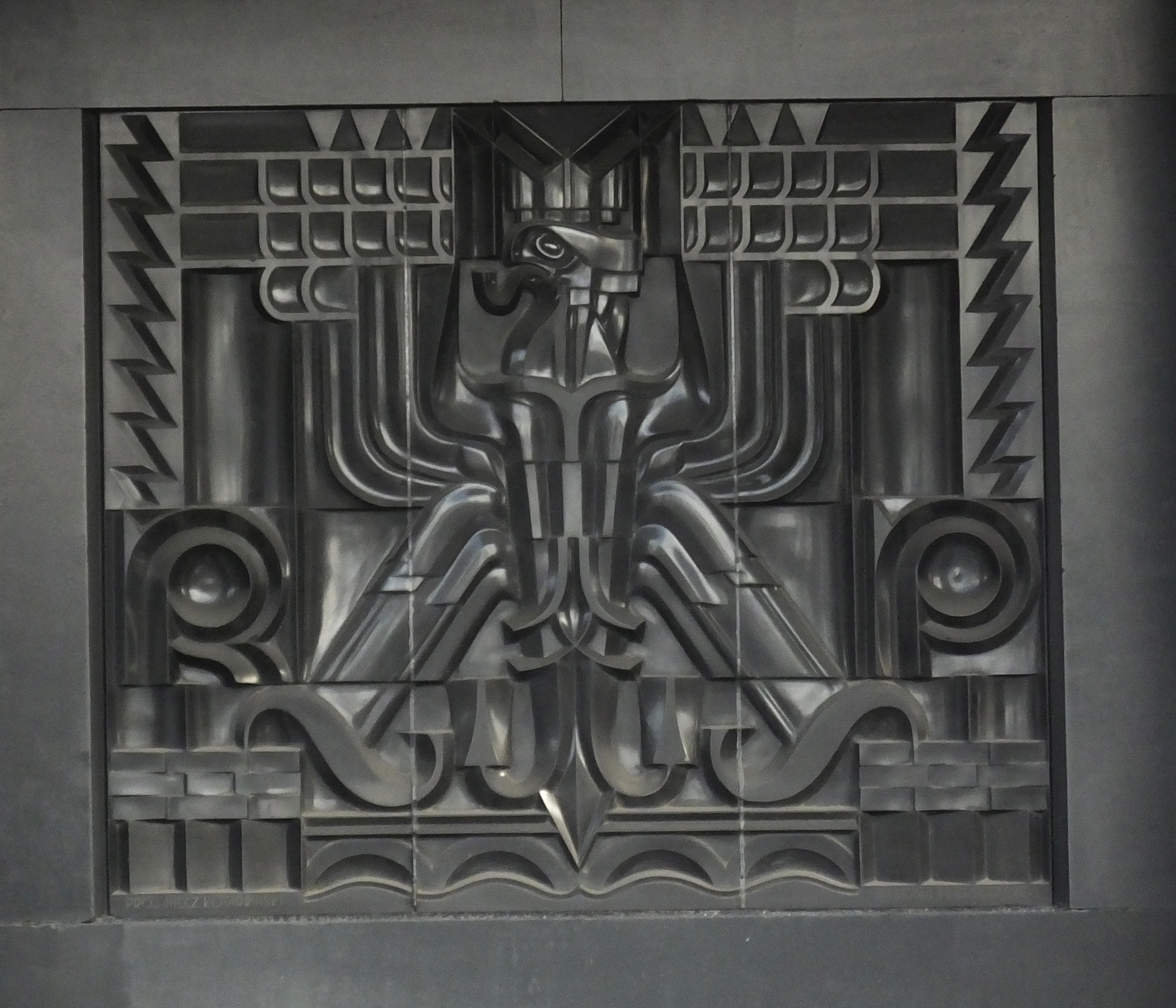
Basalt relief of a Polish eagle, Ministry of Infrastructure, by Rudolf Świerczyński (1931)

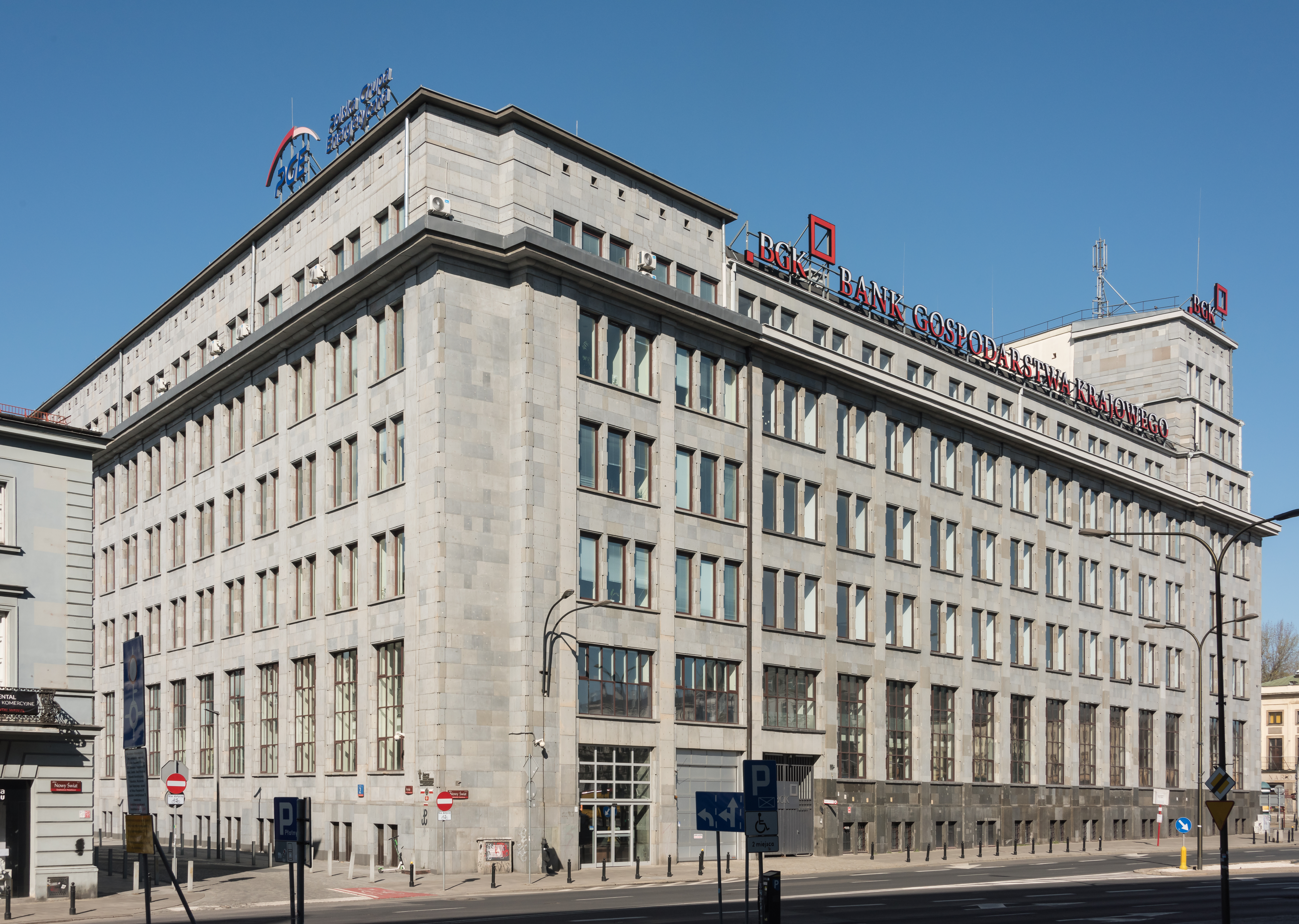
Edifice of the National Development Bank in Warsaw, by Rudolf Świerczyński (1931)

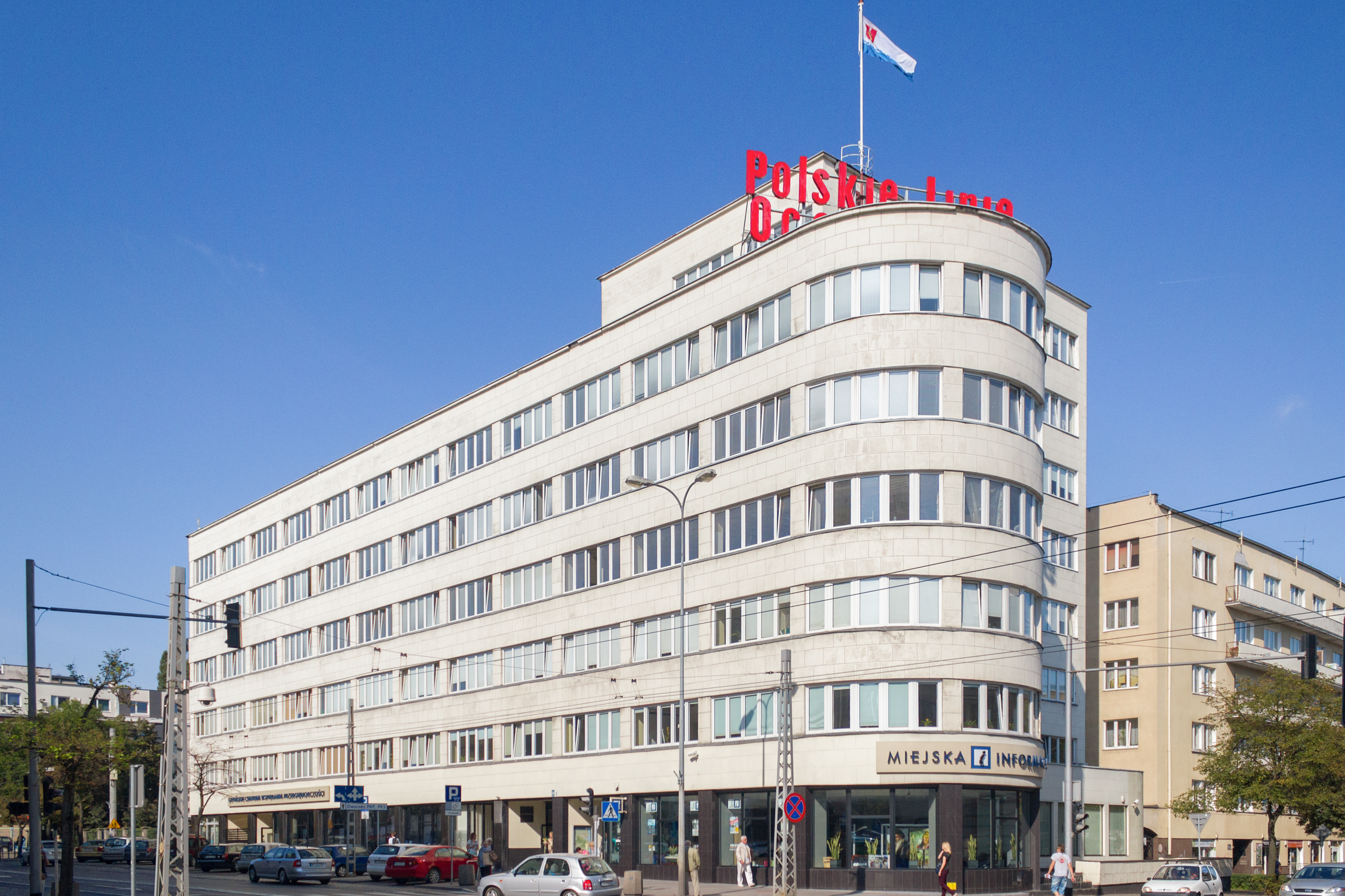
ZUS Insurance building in Gdynia, by Roman Piotrowski (1936)

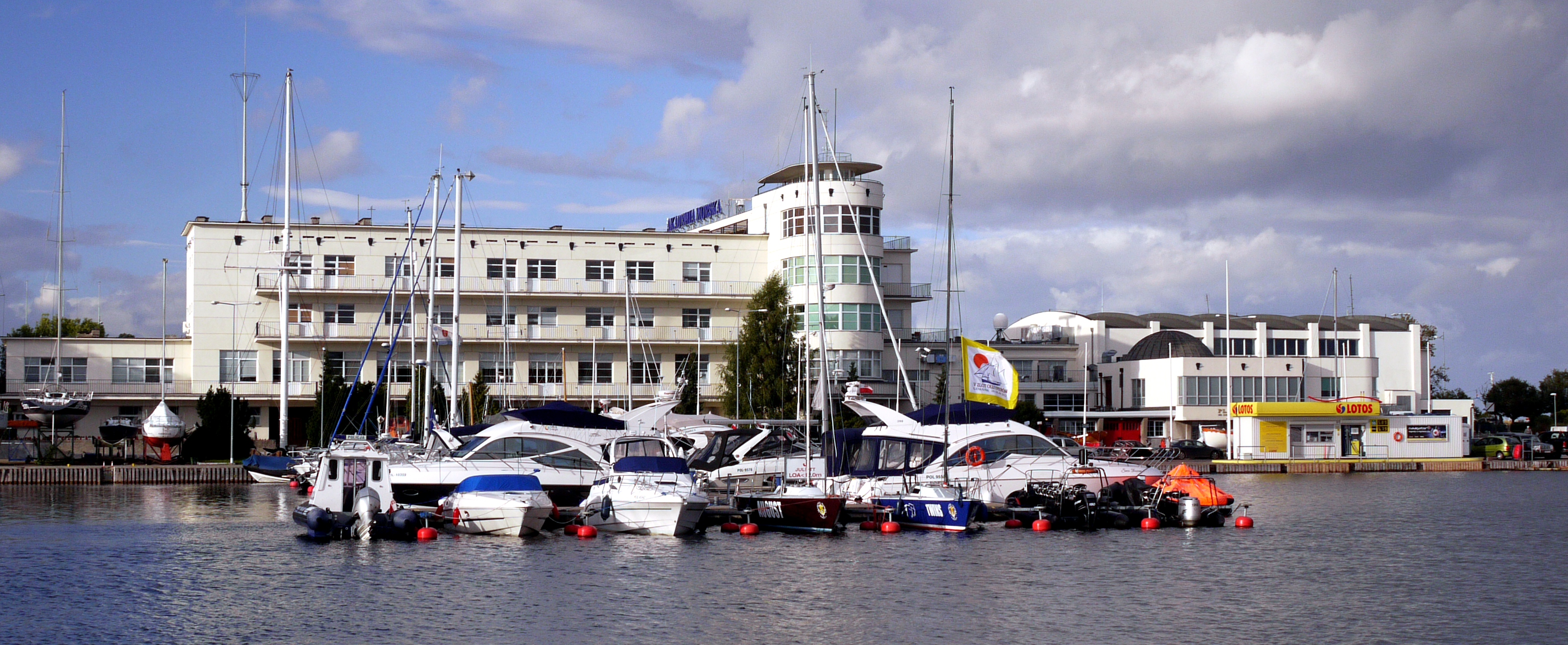
Gdynia Maritime University and adjacent marina, by Bohdan Damięcki (1937)

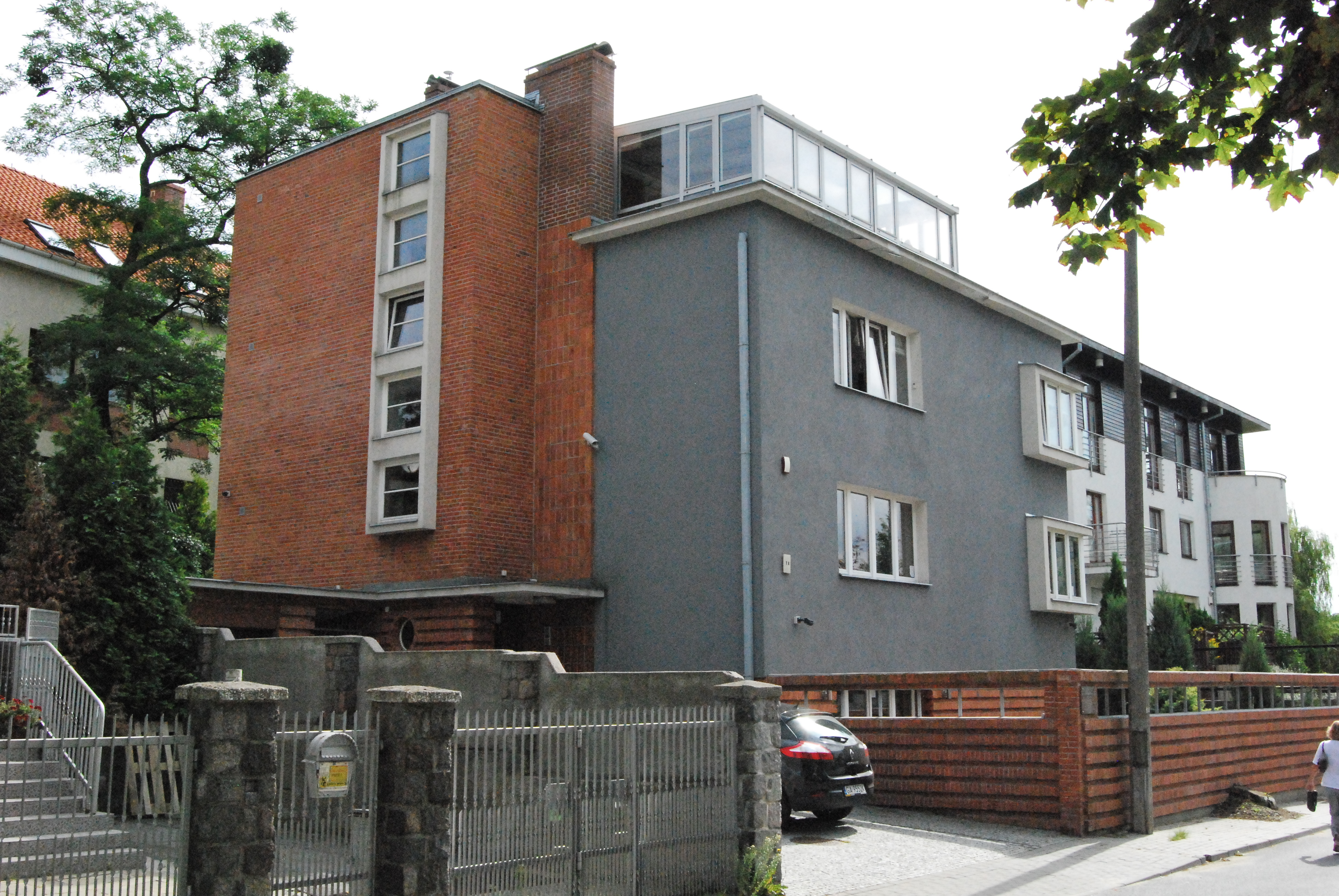
A villa in seaport Gdynia, by Tadeusz Kossak (1938)

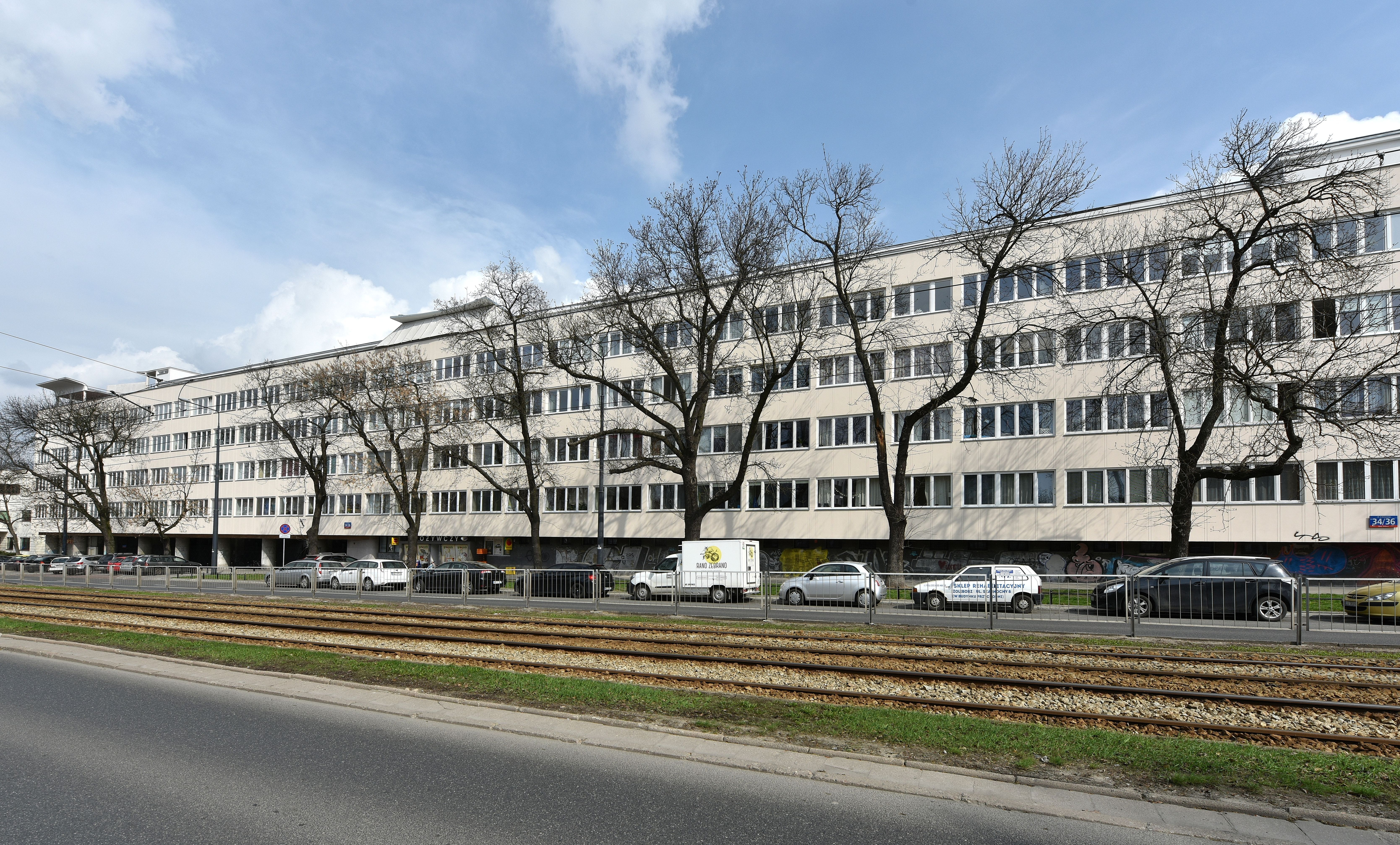
Juliusz Żórawski Housing Unit "Glass House" (1938-1941) in Warsaw with luxury apartments 177m^{2} each and large roof terrace

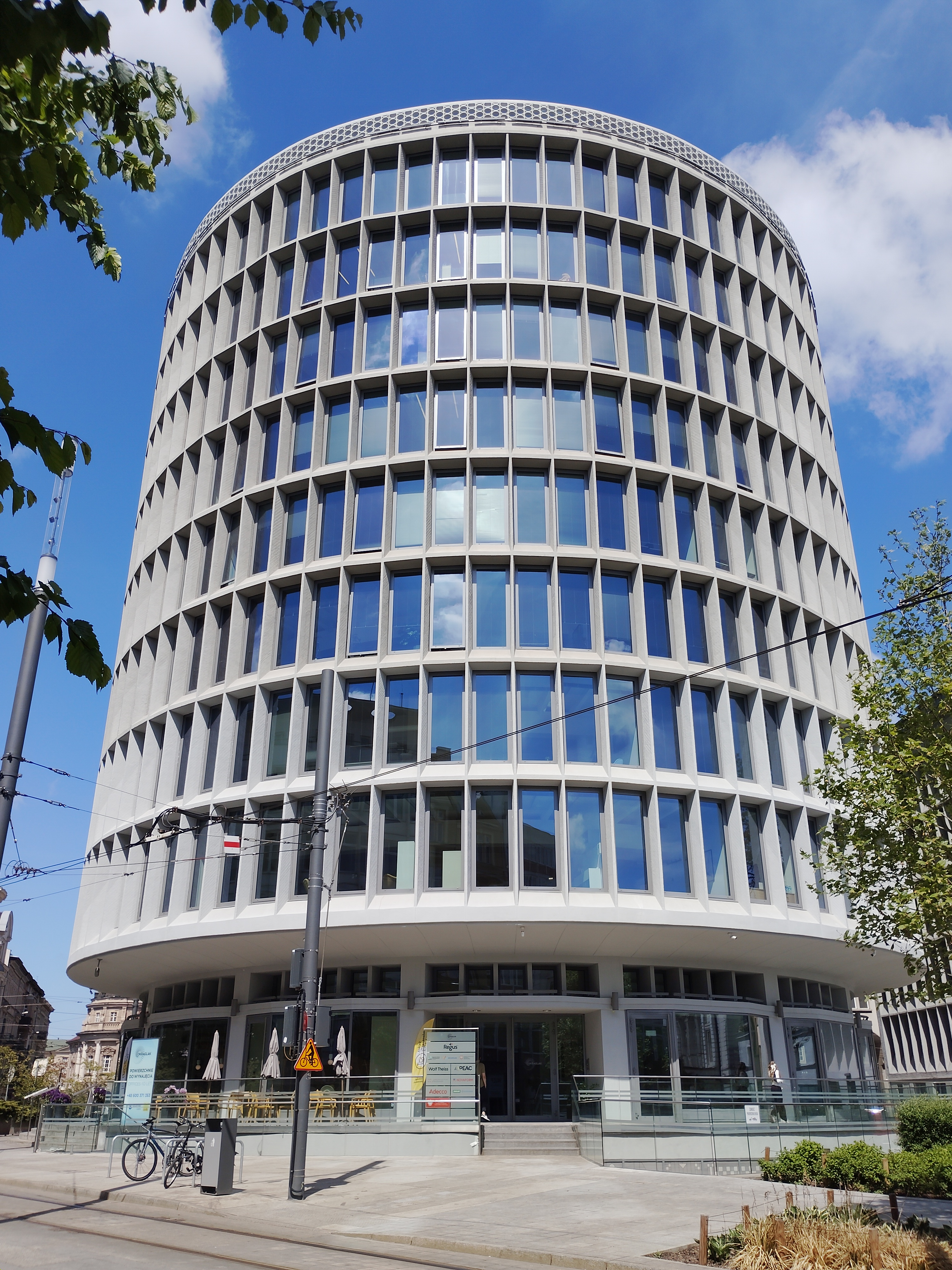
Okrąglak Department Store in Poznań, by Marek Leykam (1954)

=== Russia ===
In Russia and the former Soviet Union, functionalism was known as Constructivist architecture, and was the dominant style for major building projects between 1918 and 1932. The 1932 competition for the Palace of the Soviets and the winning entry by Boris Iofan marked the start of eclectic historicism of Stalinist Architecture and the end of constructivist domination in Soviet Union.

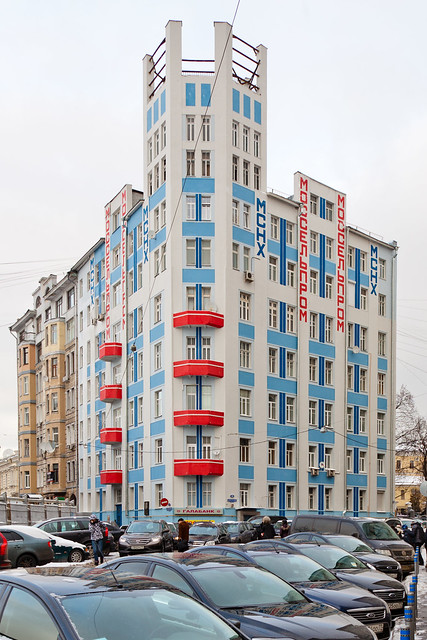
Mosselprom building (David Kogan, 1923–4)

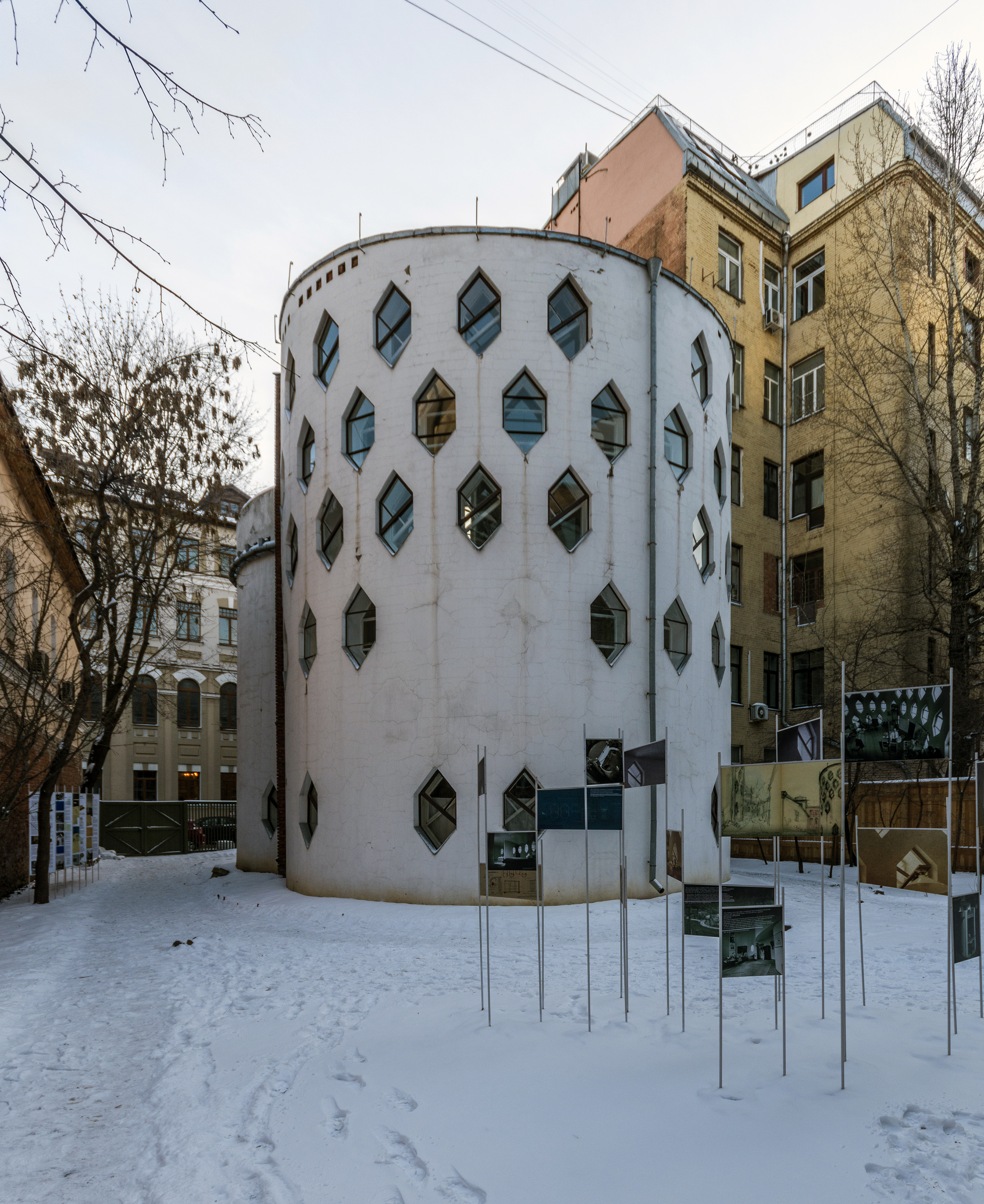
Melnikov House in Moscow. It is at the top of UNESCO's list of "Endangered Buildings". There is an international campaign to save it.

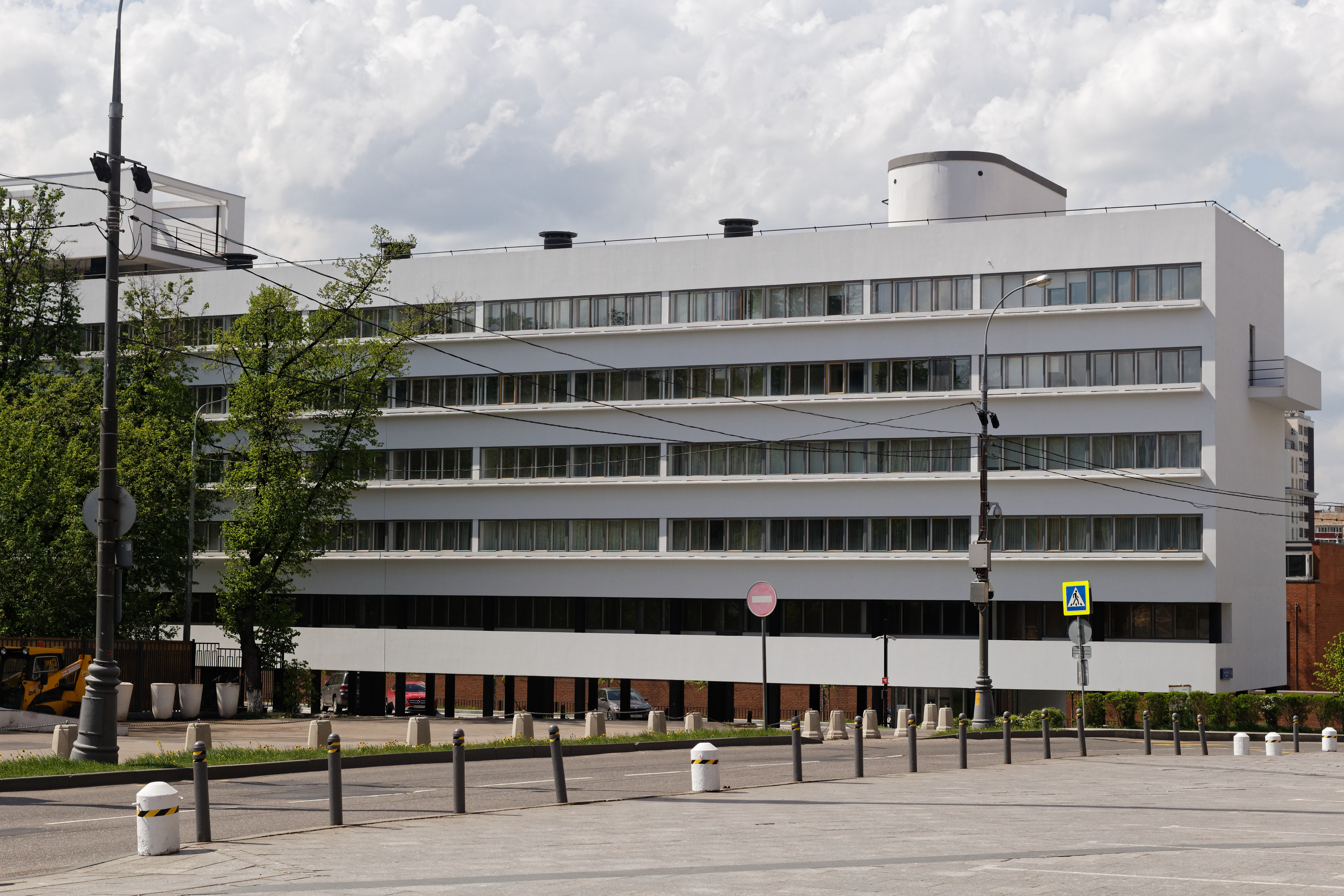
Narkomfin Building, apartment house (Moisei Ginzburg, 1930)

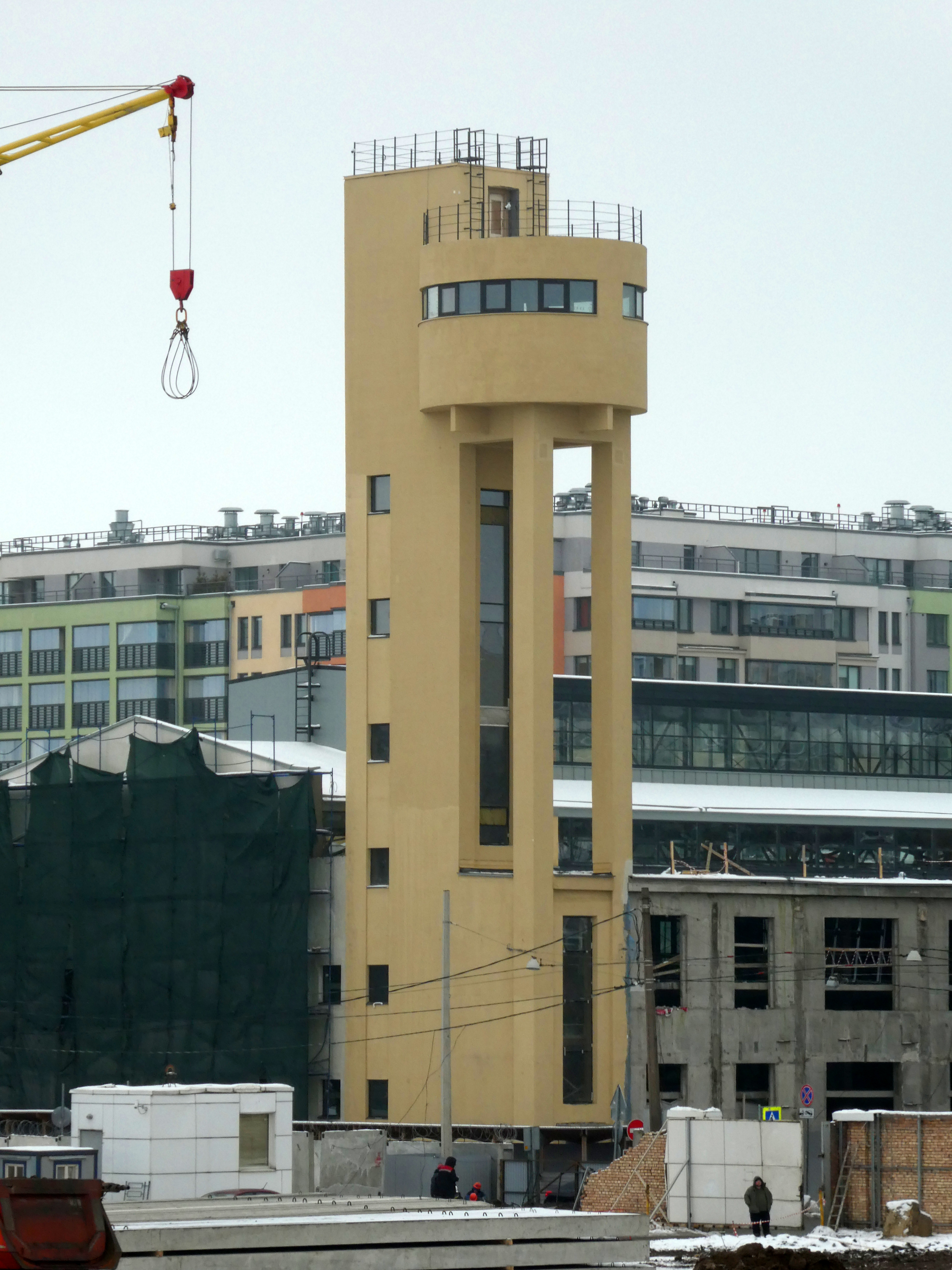
Red Carnation Factory, St Petersburg (Yakov Chernikhov)

=== Södra Ängby, Sweden ===
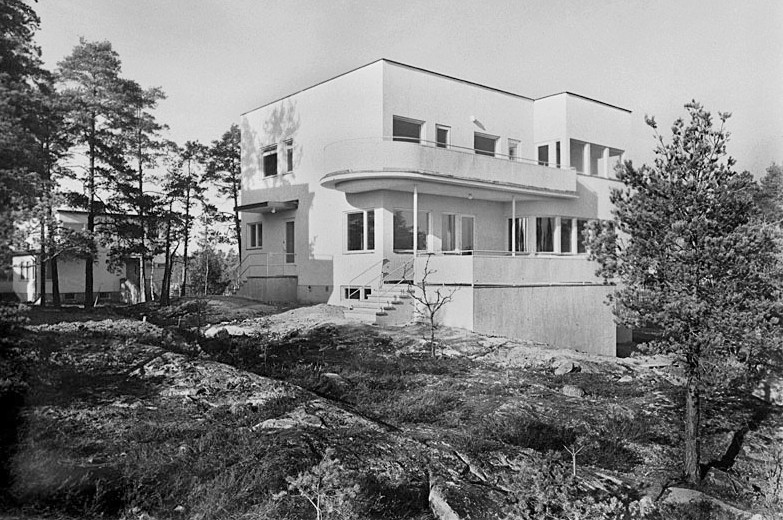
Södra Ängby, 1938

The residential area of Södra Ängby in western Stockholm, Sweden, blended a functionalist or international style with garden city ideals. Encompassing more than 500 buildings, it remains the largest coherent functionalistic villa area in Sweden and possibly the world, still well-preserved more than a half-century after its construction 1933–40 and protected as a national cultural heritage.

=== Zlín, Czech Republic ===
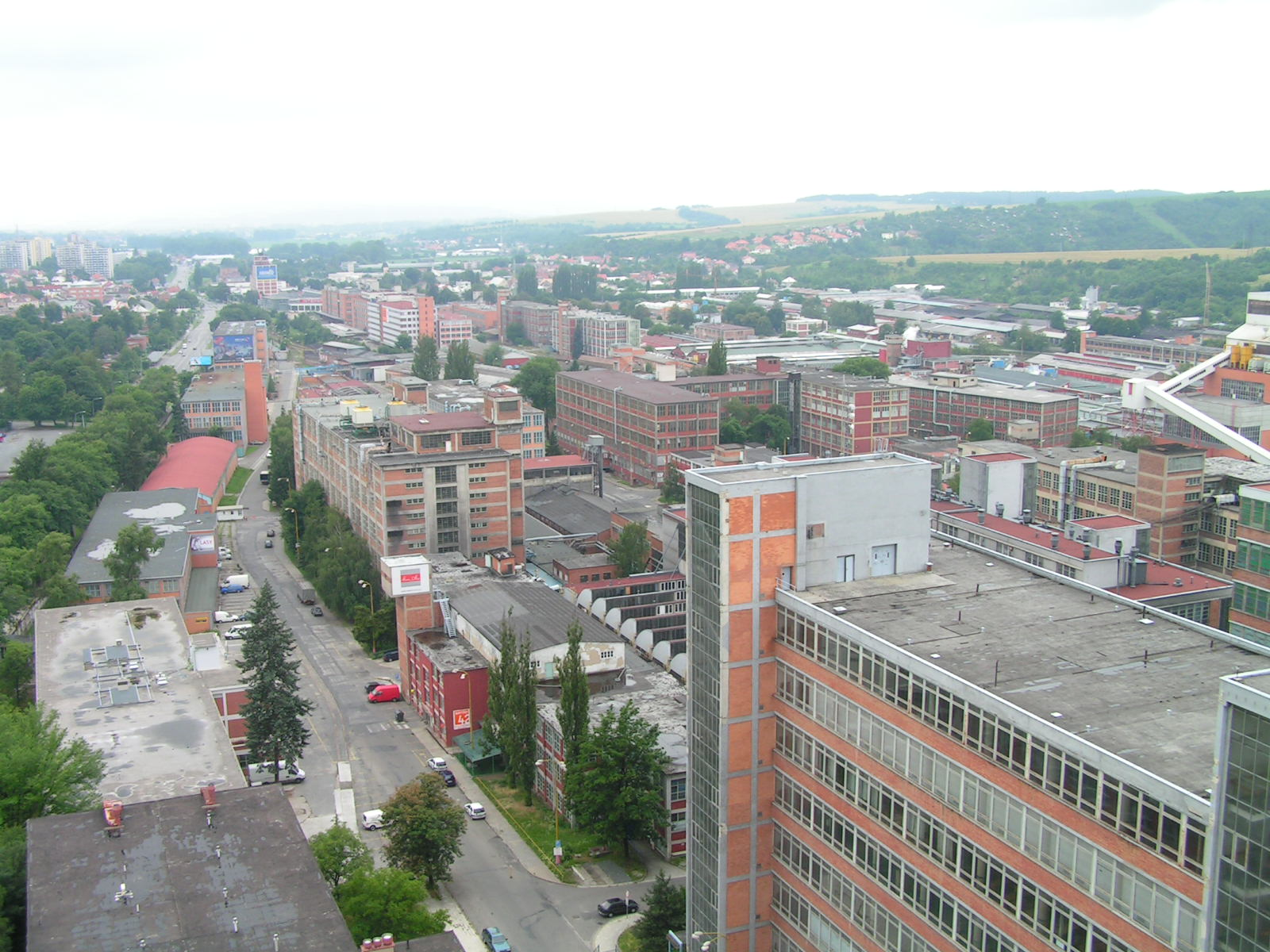
Zlín in the Czech Republic

Zlín is a city in the Czech Republic which was in the 1930s completely reconstructed on principles of functionalism. In that time the city was a headquarters of Bata Shoes company and Tomáš Baťa initiated a complex reconstruction of the city which was inspired by functionalism and the garden city movement.

Zlín's distinctive architecture was guided by principles that were strictly observed during its whole inter-war development. Its central theme was the derivation of all architectural elements from the factory buildings. The central position of the industrial production in the life of all Zlín inhabitants was to be highlighted. Hence the same building materials (red bricks, glass, reinforced concrete) were used for the construction of all public (and most private) edifices. The common structural element of Zlín architecture is a square bay of 20x20 feet (6.15x6.15 m). Although modified by several variations, this high modernist style leads to a high degree of uniformity of all buildings. It highlights the central and unique idea of an industrial garden city at the same time. Architectural and urban functionalism was to serve the demands of a modern city. The simplicity of its buildings which also translated into its functional adaptability was to prescribe (and also react to) the needs of everyday life.

The urban plan of Zlín was the creation of František Lydie Gahura, a student at Le Corbusier's atelier in Paris. Architectural highlights of the city are e.g. the Villa of Tomáš Baťa, Baťa's Hospital, Tomas Bata Memorial, The Grand Cinema or Baťa's Skyscraper.

=== Khrushchyovka ===
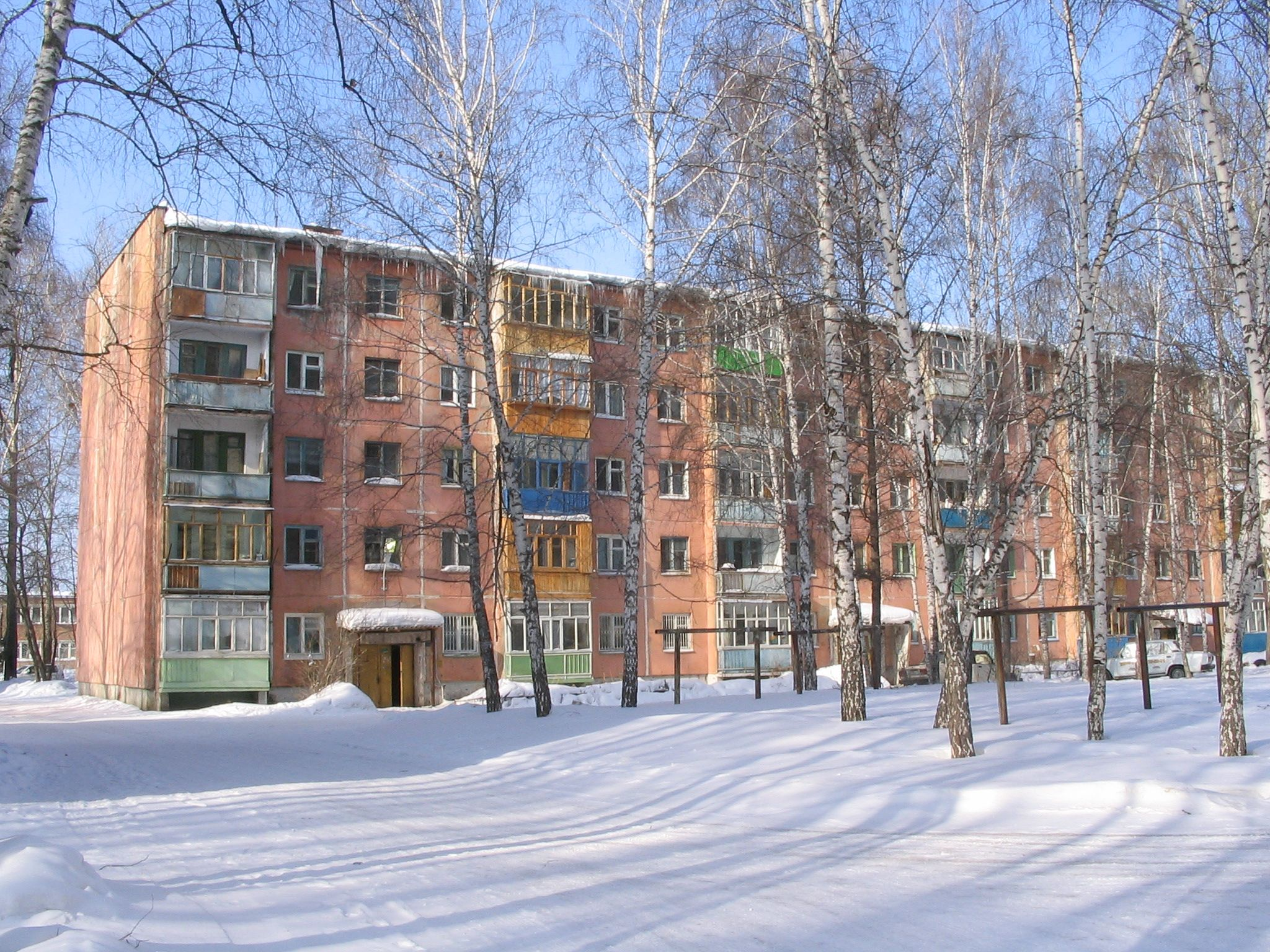
Panel khrushchovka in Tomsk, Russia.

Khrushchyovka (Russian: хрущёвка, IPA: [xrʊˈɕːɵfkə]) is an unofficial name of type of low-cost, concrete-paneled or brick three- to five-storied apartment building which was developed in the Soviet Union during the early 1960s, during the time its namesake Nikita Khrushchev directed the Soviet government. The apartment buildings also went by the name of "Khruschoba" (Хрущёв+трущоба, Khrushchev-slum).

== Functionalism in landscape architecture ==
The development of functionalism in landscape architecture paralleled its development in building architecture. At the residential scale, designers like Christopher Tunnard, James Rose, and Garrett Eckbo advocated a design philosophy based on the creation of spaces for outdoor living and the integration of house and garden. At a larger scale, the German landscape architect and planner Leberecht Migge advocated the use of edible gardens in social housing projects as a way to counteract hunger and increase self-sufficiency of families. At a still larger scale, the Congrès International d'Architecture Moderne advocated for urban design strategies based on human proportions and in support of four functions of human settlement: housing, work, play, and transport.

== Examples ==
Notable representations of functionalist architecture include:

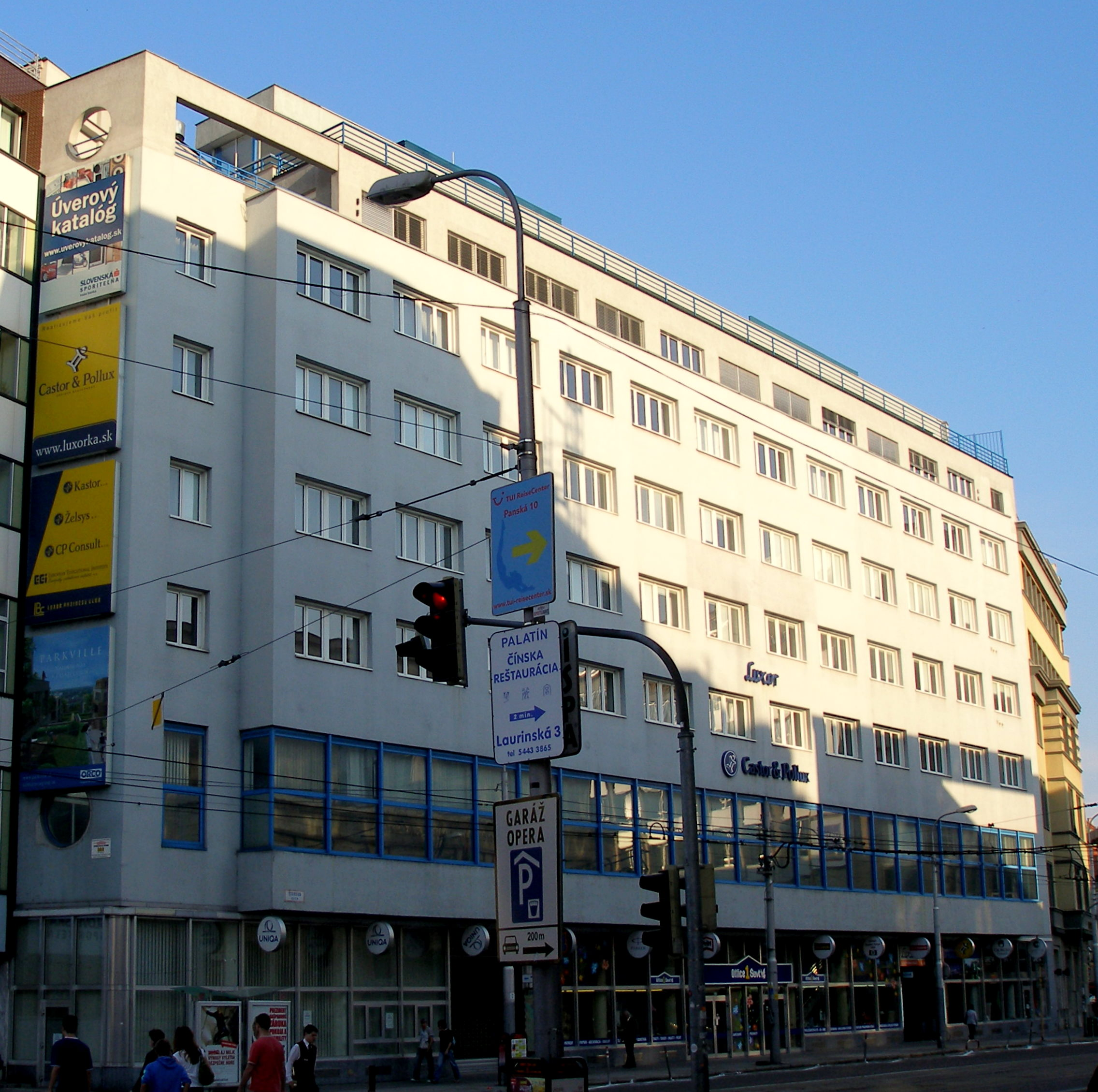
Obchodný a obytný dom Luxor (Residential and Commercial House Luxor), 1937, in Bratislava (Slovakia)

- Aarhus University, Denmark
- ADGB Trade Union School, Germany
- Administratívna budova spojov, Bratislava, Slovakia
- Obchodný a obytný dom Luxor, Bratislava, Slovakia
- Villa Tugendhat, Brno, Czech Republic
- Kavárna Era, Brno, Czech Republic
- Kolonie Nový dům, Brno, Czech Republic
- Veletržní palác, Prague, Czech Republic
- Villa Müller, Prague, Czech Republic
- Zlín city, Czech Republic
- Tomas Bata Memorial, Zlín, Czech Republic
- Booth House, Bridge Street, Sydney, Australia
- Bullfighting Arena, Póvoa de Varzim, Portugal
- Glass Palace, Helsinki, Finland
- Hotel Hollywood, Sydney, Australia
- Knarraros lighthouse, Stokkseyri, Iceland
- Pärnu Rannahotell, Pärnu, Estonia
- Pärnu Rannakohvik, Estonia
- Södra Ängby, Stockholm, Sweden
- Stanislas Brukalski's villa, Warsaw, Poland
- Modernist Center of Gdynia, Poland
- Villa Savoye, Poissy, France

== See also ==
- Modernist architecture; streamline moderne
- Enrique Yáñez
- Form follows function
- Structuralism (architecture)

== Literature ==
- Vers une Architecture and Villa Savoye: A Comparison of Treatise and Building – A multipart essay explaining the basics of Le Corbusier's theory and contrasting them with his built work.
- Behne, Adolf (1923). The Modern Functional Building. Michael Robinson, trans. Santa Monica: Getty Research Institute, 1996.
- Forty, Adrian (2000). "Function". Words and Buildings, A Vocabulary of Modern Architecture. Thames & Hudson, p. 174–195.
- Michl, Jan (1995). Form follows WHAT? The modernist notion of function as a carte blanche 1995.
