= Helena Hernmarck =

Swedish tapestry artist (born 1941)

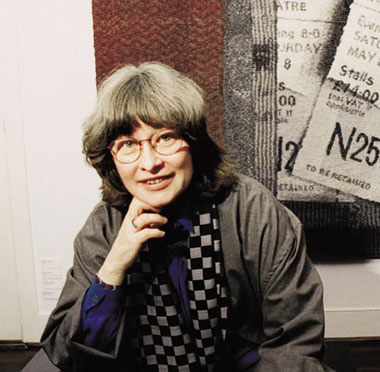
- Born: Helena Maria Hernmarck; 1941 (age 84–85); Stockholm, Sweden
- Education: Friends of Handicraft
- Alma mater: Konstfack
- Known for: Tapestry
- Style: Photo-tapestry
- Spouse: Niels Diffrient (m. 1976; died 2013)
- Parents: Carl Hernmarck (father); Kerstin Simon (mother)
- Relatives: Sven Markelius
- Awards: Prince Eugen Medal; 1999
- Website: hernmarck.com

Helena Hernmarck (born in Stockholm, Sweden, 1941) is a Swedish tapestry artist who lives and works in the United States. She is best known for her monumental tapestries designed for architectural settings.

== Early life and education ==
Hernmark's parents were Carl Hernmarck, curator of decorative arts at the Swedish National Museum of Fine Arts, and Kerstin Simon, a journalist. Her uncle, Swedish modernist architect Sven Markelius, was one of five authors of the modernist manifesto, acceptera, published in 1931. Hernmarck studied weaving in Stockholm, first at the Friends of Handicraft, and later at Sweden’s University College of Arts, Crafts and Design. Her primary teacher was Swedish textile artist Edna Martin. She apprenticed with textile designer Alice Lund.

== Career ==
Hernmarck lived in Canada from 1964–1972, followed by England 1972–1975, eventually moving to New York in 1975. Hernmarck married industrial designer Niels Diffrient in 1976. She participated in the Lausanne Biennales of 1965, 1967, and 1969, received a solo exhibition at MoMA in 1973, and a second solo exhibition at the Los Angeles County Museum of Art in 1974. In 1973, she received the American Institute of Architects Craftsmanship Medal.

Hernmarck began producing monumental tapestries for corporate settings in the late 1960s, eventually working with architects such as Philip Johnson, I.M. Pei and Partners, Skidmore Owings and Merrill (SOM), George Nelson, Ulrich Franzen, Hugh Stubbins, John Carl Warnecke, Kevin Roche, and others. One of her earliest commissions was for the executive offices of the Weyerhaeuser Company in Seattle, Washington (1970–71) and one of her later commissions was for the Time Warner Center in New York. In 1999, Hernmarck had a major retrospective exhibition at the Museum at the Fashion Institute of Technology, "Monumental and Intimate," which traveled to Waldemarsudde in Stockholm, Sweden later that year. She participated in the “Sourcing the Museum” exhibition at the Textile Museum in Washington, D.C., in 2012. In 2018 the Aldrich Contemporary Art Museum held an exhibit entitled Weaving in Progress. The exhibition included a weaving studio where Hernmarck would weave. Her work is held in private, corporate, and museum collections such as the Art Institute of Chicago, the Metropolitan Museum of Art, the Minneapolis Institute of Art, the Museum of Modern Art, and the Smithsonian American Art Museum.

== Work ==
Hernmarck was among the first tapestry artists to use photographs as the basis for her designs, which rely on optical illusions to create photorealistic effects. Her work in the 1960s reflected the influence of pop culture with tapestries such as Newspapers (1968) woven from a composition of newspaper clippings and Little Richard (1969) simulating a 7 by 8 foot album cover. In the 1970s, Hernmarck began working from enlarged color photographs, rendering the effects of light on water in tapestries such as Sailing (1976), which was produced for the Federal Reserve Bank of Boston. Her 1990 Urn, a tromp l'oeil tapestry made for Philip Johnson’s Peachtree Tower in Atlanta, Georgia, replicates elements of the surrounding architecture. Hernmarck has also used paper collages, watercolors, and photographic details as the basis for her designs. Hernmarck’s technique differs from traditional gobelin tapestry weaving in that it uses texture, color, and value contrast to establish line, rather than sharp lines and patterns. Before each major commission, Hernmarck works with Wålstedts mill in Dala-Floda, Sweden to spin and dye yarn. Some of Hernmarck's tapestries are woven, with assistants, at her studio in Connecticut. Others are subcontracted to Alice Lund’s Textile Studio in Dalarna, Sweden.

== Selected solo exhibitions ==
- Museum of Modern Art, New York City, 1973
- Museum at the Fashion Institute of Technology, New York City 1999
- American Swedish Institute, Minneapolis, MN 2012

== Awards and recognition ==
- American Institute of Architects Craftsmanship Medal, 1973
- American Craft Council, College of Fellows, 1996
- Connecticut Commission on the Arts, Governor’s Arts Award, 1998
- Sweden’s Prins Eugen Medal, 1999
- Swedish American of the Year, 2000
- Sophie Adlersparres Medalj, 2002

== Selected bibliography ==
- Constantine, M., & Larsen, J. L. (1973). Beyond craft: the art fabric. New York: Van Nostrand Reinhold Co.
- Hernmarck, H., Boman, M., Malarcher, P., Brummer, H. H., & Dunlap, R. (1999). Helena Hernmarck: Tapestry artist. Stockholm: Byggförlaget. Seattle: University of Washington Press.
- Koplos, Janet, & Metcalf, Bruce (2010). Makers: A History of American Studio Craft. Chapel Hill: The University of North Carolina Press.
- McFadden, D. R., Cooper-Hewitt Museum., Minnesota Museum of Art., & Renwick Gallery. (1982). Scandinavian Modern Design, 1880–1980. New York: Abrams.

== See also ==
- Fiber Art
- Weaving
- Tapestry
