= Bengt Lindroos =

Swedish architect (1918–2010)

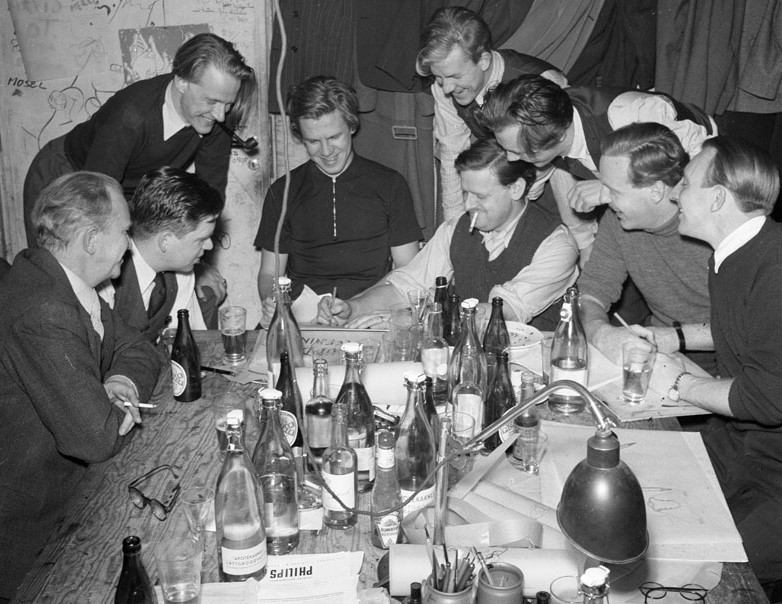
- The writers of Blandaren, a student humour magazine from founded by students at the Royal Institute of Technology, in 1943 with Lindroos as the third from the left.
- Born: Bengt Ingmar Lindroos; 22 September 1918; Finspång Municipality, Sweden
- Died: 22 August 2010 (aged 91)
- Education: Royal Institute of Technology
- Occupation: Architect
- Awards: Kasper Salin Prize
- Buildings: Kaknästornet, Hammarbytornet, Söderledskyrkan

Bengt Ingmar Lindroos (22 September 1918 – 22 August 2010) was a Swedish architect.

Lindroos started drafting houses for a local builder at the age of 17 years and received his formal education at the Royal Institute of Technology from 1942 to 1945.

After being employed by Sven Markelius, he opened an office together with Hans Borgström in 1954. He designed the Kaknästornet television tower in 1967. He was awarded the Prince Eugen Medal in 1983.

He designed in the 1986 Kasper Salin Prize-winning building block Kvarteret Drottningen. He also designed the prize of the competition.

He published a monograph about architecture in 2008.

== Death ==
Lindroos died on 22 August 2010, aged 92.

== Bibliography ==
- Och så vidare- (1989)
- Att vara arkitekt kan vara att... (2010)
