= Floor area ratio =

Building density measurement

Comparison of floor area ratio (FAR) or floor space index (FSI) and building coverage ratio (BCR)

Floor area ratio (FAR) is the ratio of a building's total floor area (gross floor area) to the size of the piece of land upon which it is built. In an attempt to limit urban density, cities often specify a legal limit for this ratio in their zoning codes, along with a building-to-land ratio.. FAR includes all floor areas but is indifferent to their spatial distribution on the lot whereas the building coverage ratio (or lot coverage) measures building footprint on the lot but is indifferent to building height.

Written as a formula, FAR = (gross floor area)/(area of the plot)

Limits on floor area ratios lead to less housing supply, and higher rents.

== Terminology ==
Floor area ratio is sometimes called floor space ratio (FSR), floor space index (FSI), site ratio or plot ratio.

The difference between FAR and FSI is that the first is a ratio, while the latter is an index. Index numbers are values expressed as a percentage of a single base figure. Thus an FAR of 1.5 is translated as an FSI of 150%.

=== Regional variation ===
The terms most commonly used for this measurement vary from one country or region to the next.

In Australia floor space ratio (FSR) is used in New South Wales and plot ratio in Western Australia. FAR's are widely used in Australia.

In India floor space index (FSI) and floor area ratio (FAR) are both used.

In the United Kingdom and Hong Kong both plot ratio and site ratio are used.

== History ==
Floor area ratios emerged as an instrument of urban planning in Europe and the United States in the 1920s.

They were first put into use as formal planning instruments in the 1925 zoning plan for Berlin. The zoning plan established nine zone types, with FAR limits ranging from 0.2 to 3.

German precedent informed Swedish planning debates of the 1930s, in which Uno Åhren was a firm proponent of FAR as a planning instrument. It was formally introduced into Swedish building law in 1947.

One of the purposes of the 1916 zoning ordinance of New York City was to prevent tall buildings from obstructing too much light and air. The 1916 zoning ordinance sought to control building size by regulating height and setback requirements for towers.

Proposals to regulate floor area ratios were put forward by New York planning reformers during the 1930s and 1940s, which greatly influenced American planning practice, but they were not implemented in the entire city until 1961.

Buildings built before 1961 often have FARs that are illegal today, such as the Empire State Building which has an FAR of 25 - meaning that it earns considerably greater rent than a newer building on the same land could hope for.

== Purpose and use ==
The floor area ratio (FAR) can be used in zoning to limit urban density. While it directly limits building density, indirectly it also limits the number of people that a building can hold, without controlling a building's external shape.

Urban designers claim that the use of a FAR "shifts the conversation away from maximising yield and towards good design, at the building and neighbourhood scale".

== Impact on land value ==
FAR has a major impact on the value of the land. Higher allowable FAR yields higher land value.

A 2022 study found that lower maximum-allowed FAR in New York City led to lower land value and lower density.

== Criticism ==
Andres Duany et al. (2000) note:

1. Abdicating to floor area ratios (market forces) is the opposite of aiming a community toward something more than the sum of its parts.
2. FAR, a poor predictor of physical form, should not be used when the objective is to conserve and enhance neighborhood character; whereas traditional design standards (height, lot coverage and setbacks or build-to lines) enable anyone to make reasonably accurate predictions, recognize violations, and feel secure in their investment decisions.
3. If FAR is carelessly combined with traditional setbacks, assembled lots have a considerable advantage over individual lots, which has a negative effect on fine-grained cities and the diversity of ownership.
4. FAR does not consider the factors affecting the environment like the new building's greenhouse gas emissions, energy consumption, and repercussions on local ecosystems.

Clarifying Duany's second criticism in reference to "lot coverage": If localities seek to regulate density through floor area ratio, the logical consequence is to encourage expansive one story building with less green space, as single story construction is less expensive than multi-story construction on a per square foot basis. On the other hand, if density is regulated by building coverage ratio (a.k.a. lot coverage or site coverage) then green space can be preserved and multi-story construction becomes financial advantageous. This outcome is demonstrated in the illustration comparing FAR to BCR.
