= Blandaren =

Worlds oldest humor magazine

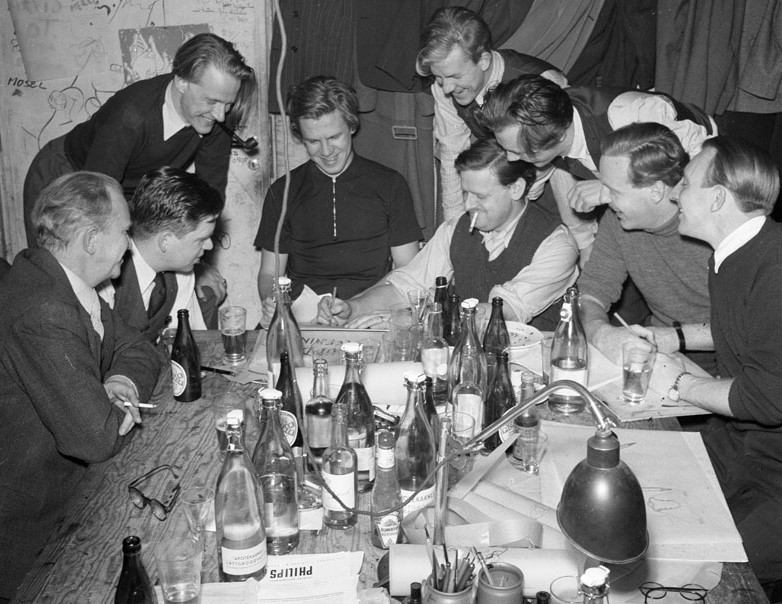
Editors of Blandaren, 1943. From the left: Engströmer, Olsson, Lindroos, Thafvelin, Molander, Asplund, Knutsson och Orlando.

Blandaren is the world's oldest humor magazine, founded in 1863 by students at KTH Royal Institute of Technology in Stockholm. The aesthetics of Blandaren has been described as having dadaistic, absurdist, satirical and surrealist qualities.

== History ==
Throughout its long history spanning over a century, Blandaren has undergone significant transformations. Initially, it published two annual issues: Vårblandaren and Gåsblandaren. The latter being released around St. Martin's Day. In its contemporary form, releases an annual issue in December. In 2016, Blandaren released a historical work to commemorate the 153-year-long history. Blandaren has also released several similar historical editions to celebrate the 80-, 100- and 126-year-long history.

=== Editors ===
Throughout its history, Blandaren has had a diverse array of editors, including individuals like Bengt Lindroos (architect), Pontus Hutlén (art collector and museum director), Gunnar Asplund (architect), Ferdinand Boberg (architect), and Maja Säfström (illustrator).

==== Relationship to the Student union ====
Blandaren was still a part of the Student Union at the Royal Institute of Technology towards the end of the 1960s. Blandaren accounted for a large share of the student unions income, and had their facilities at the KTH campus. Due to the spirit of 1968, Blandaren came to be viewed as socially unacceptable. Blandaren subsequently left the student union and is since 1969 a voluntary association.

==== Historical trivia ====
During the late 50s Jean Tinguely stayed in Blandaren's facilities during the recording of the avant-garde movie En dag i staden (English: A Day in the City).

== Characteristics ==
Blandaren stands out in the magazine world due to its unusually large size. It is sold by teknologer most commonly in central Stockholm during December. The teknologer have a rather unusual approach to selling Blandaren, they don boilersuits adorned with bells and whistles and simply shout 'Blandaren!' to capture the attention of presumptive readers."

== Blandaren stipend fund dedicated to the bad memory of Edward Sminks ==
Blandaren operates a stipend fund dedicated to Edward Sminks bad memory. Although there are no strict application criteria, there exists a list of twelve demands that recipients should ideally meet. The final application date is the first of March every year. Over the years, recipients of Blandaren's stipend fund dedicated to the bad memory of Edward Sminks" have received support for a diverse range of creative endeavors.

These recipients represent a wide array of creative endeavors, ranging from literature and visual arts to comedy, space exploration, and more. The fund has been instrumental in supporting individuals and groups in their pursuit of unique projects, ensuring that the legacy of Edvard Sminks lives on through their creative contributions.

Recipients - Blandarens stipend fund to the bad memory of Edward Sminks:
Year	Recipient
2006	Monica Lehn Domnick
2007	Per-Arne Sträng
2008	Jan och Maria Berglin
2009	Leo Marco Englund
2012	Maja K Zetterberg
2013	Anna Larsson(space-student)
2016	Mimi Fürst
2017	Moa Lundqvist
2018	Saga Berlin

== See also ==
- Dada
- Fluxus
- Situationist international
