= Kaknästornet =

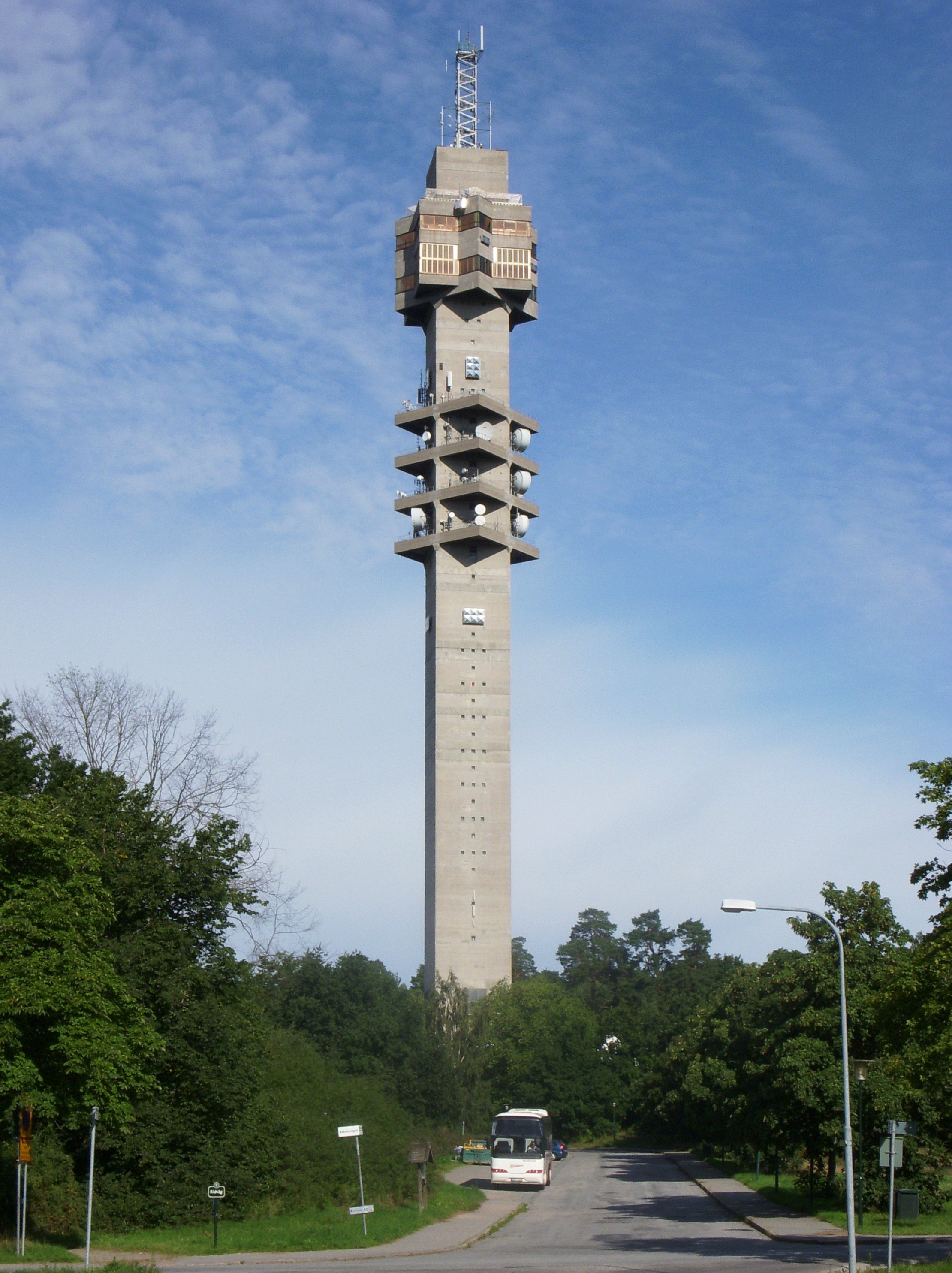
- Kaknästornet in 2008.
- Alternative names: Kaknäs Tower

General information
- Type: Telecommunications tower
- Architectural style: Brutalism
- Location: Mörka Kroken 28–30, Stockholm, Sweden
- Coordinates: 59°20′06″N 018°07′35″E
- Construction started: 1963
- Completed: 1967
- Inaugurated: 12 May 1967
- Owner: Teracom

Height
- Height: 155 m (509 ft)

Technical details
- Floor count: 30

Design and construction
- Architects: Hans Borgström; Bengt Lindroos
- Awards: Trip Advisor Award of Excellence

Website
- www.kaknastornet.se

The Kaknäs tower (Swedish: Kaknästornet) is a telecommunications tower located at Ladugårdsgärdet in Stockholm, Sweden. The tower is a major hub of Swedish television, radio and satellite broadcasts. It was finished in 1967, designed by architect Bengt Lindroos, and the height is 155 metres (509 ft) or 170 metres (560 ft) with the top antenna included. For a few years Kaknästornet was the tallest building in the Nordic countries until Näsinneula was opened in Tampere, Finland in 1971. It was surpassed in 2005 by the Turning Torso in Malmö. The tower is owned by the national Swedish broadcasting company Teracom. Its name comes from the ancient name of the area, Kaknäs.

The tower used to be open to the public, with an information centre and gift shop, indoor and outdoor observation decks as well as a restaurant, but has now been permanently closed to the public since 2018 on the grounds that the security repairs would have become too expensive. It was later revealed that the real cause is the threat of foreign intelligence. The fear is that a foreign power would seek to take control of important communication lines and systems of society. According to Swedish television, the Swedish security police have stated in a report in 2017 that the number of foreign intelligence companies has increased, and the tower will be closed due to the report.

Since December 2019, it is forbidden to photograph, copy, measure or describe the tower without permission.

== Popular culture ==
- The tower appears in the SVT1 (a.k.a. Kanal1) ident from 1988.
- A photo taken from the tower appears on the cover of the album "Erotik" by the black metal band Lifelover

== Gallery ==
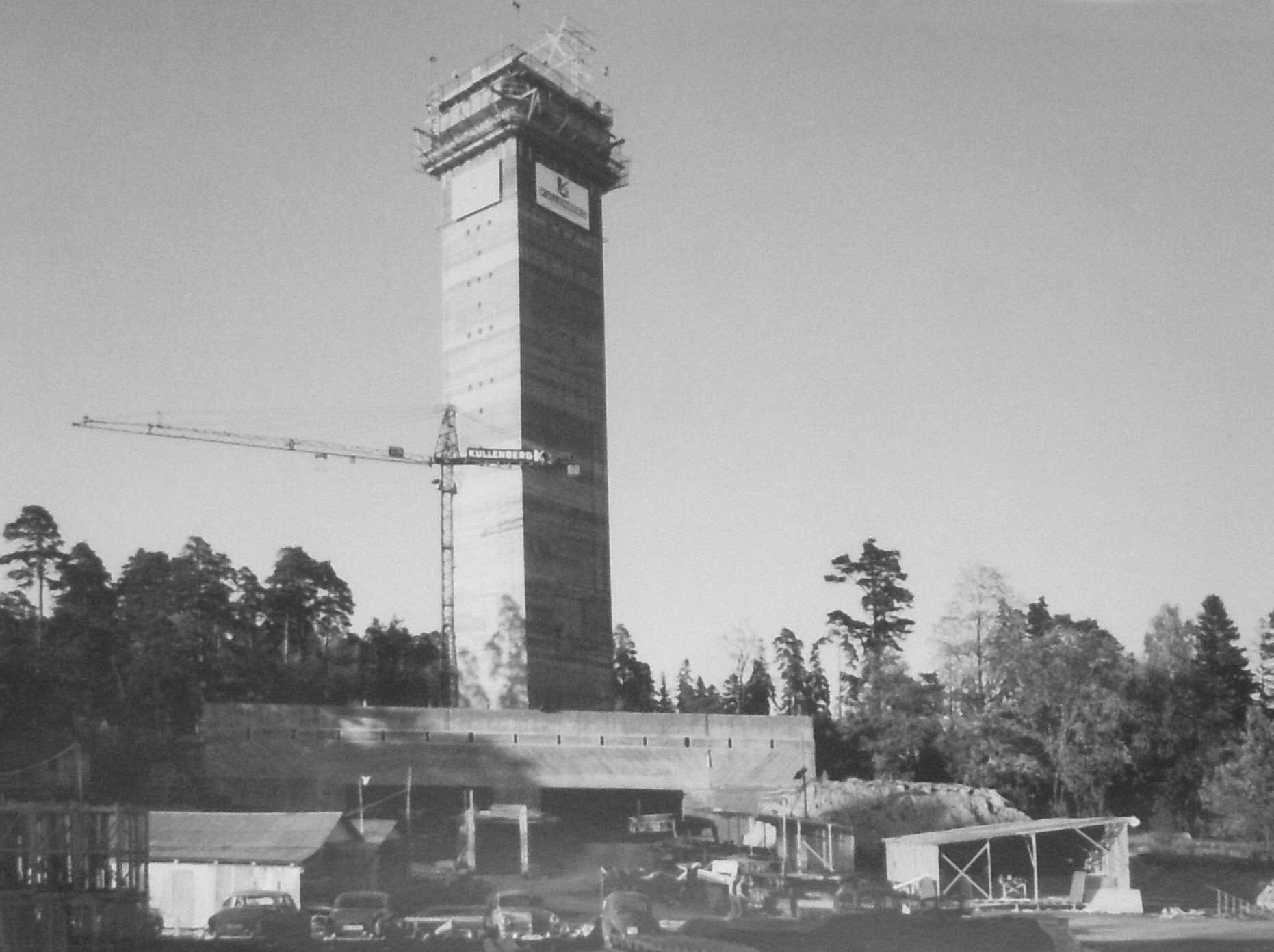
The Kaknäs Tower during construction, 1966.

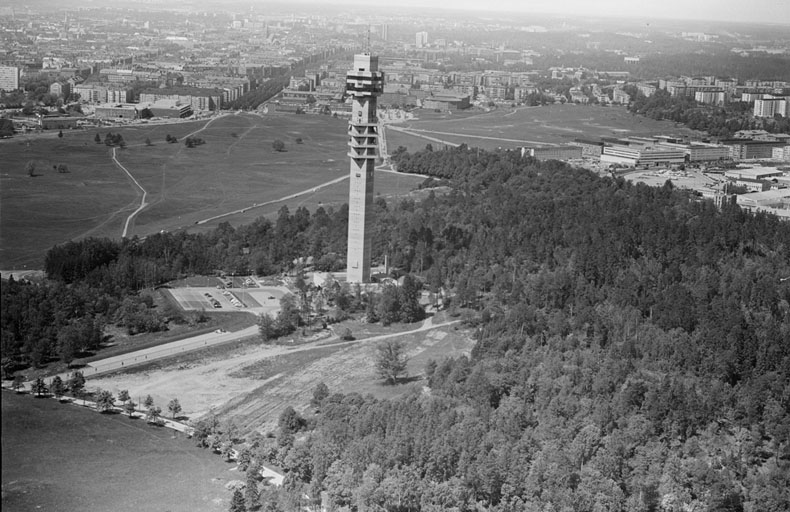
gardet and cake tower newly constructed 1976.

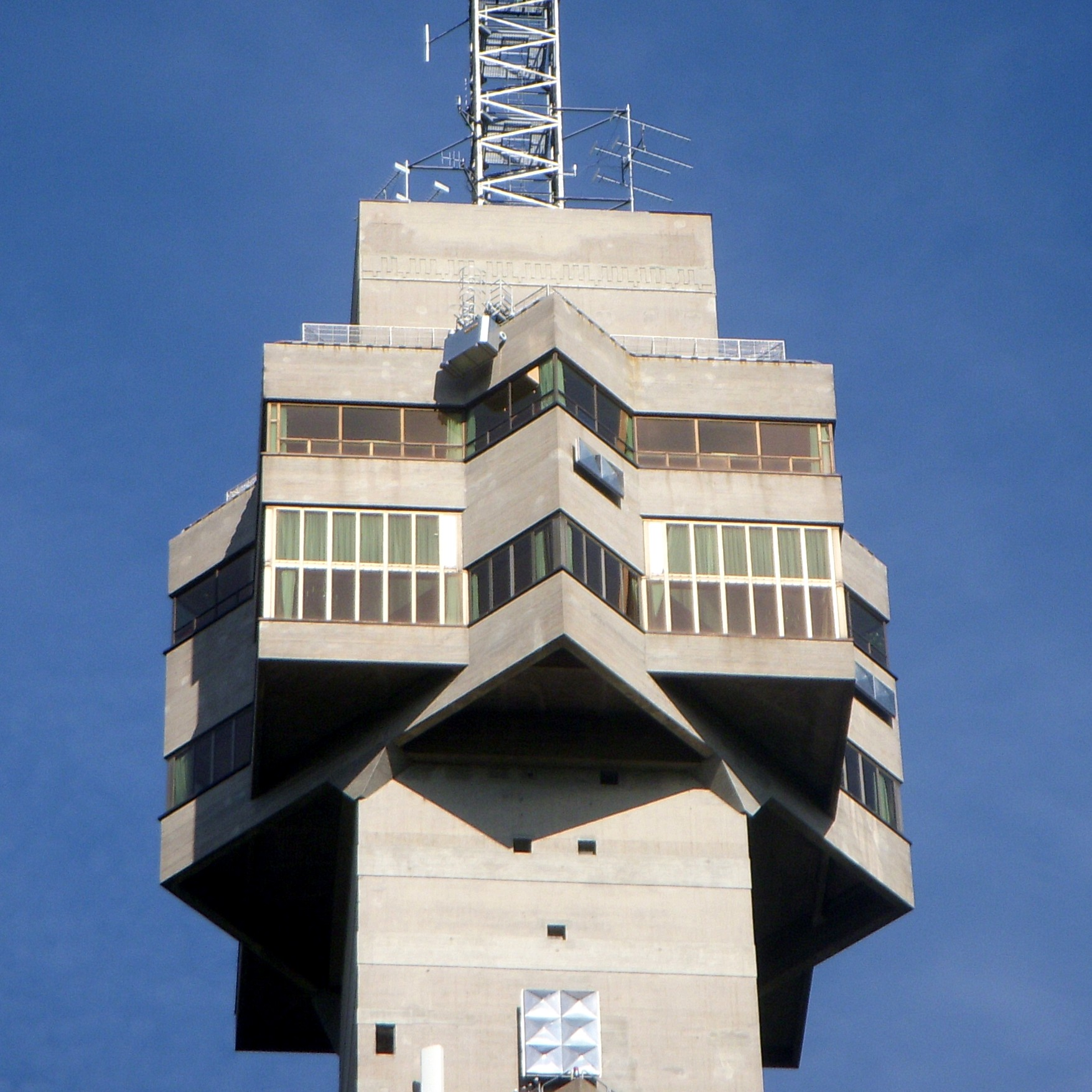
mainpod of the kaknästornet in stockholm, Sweden.

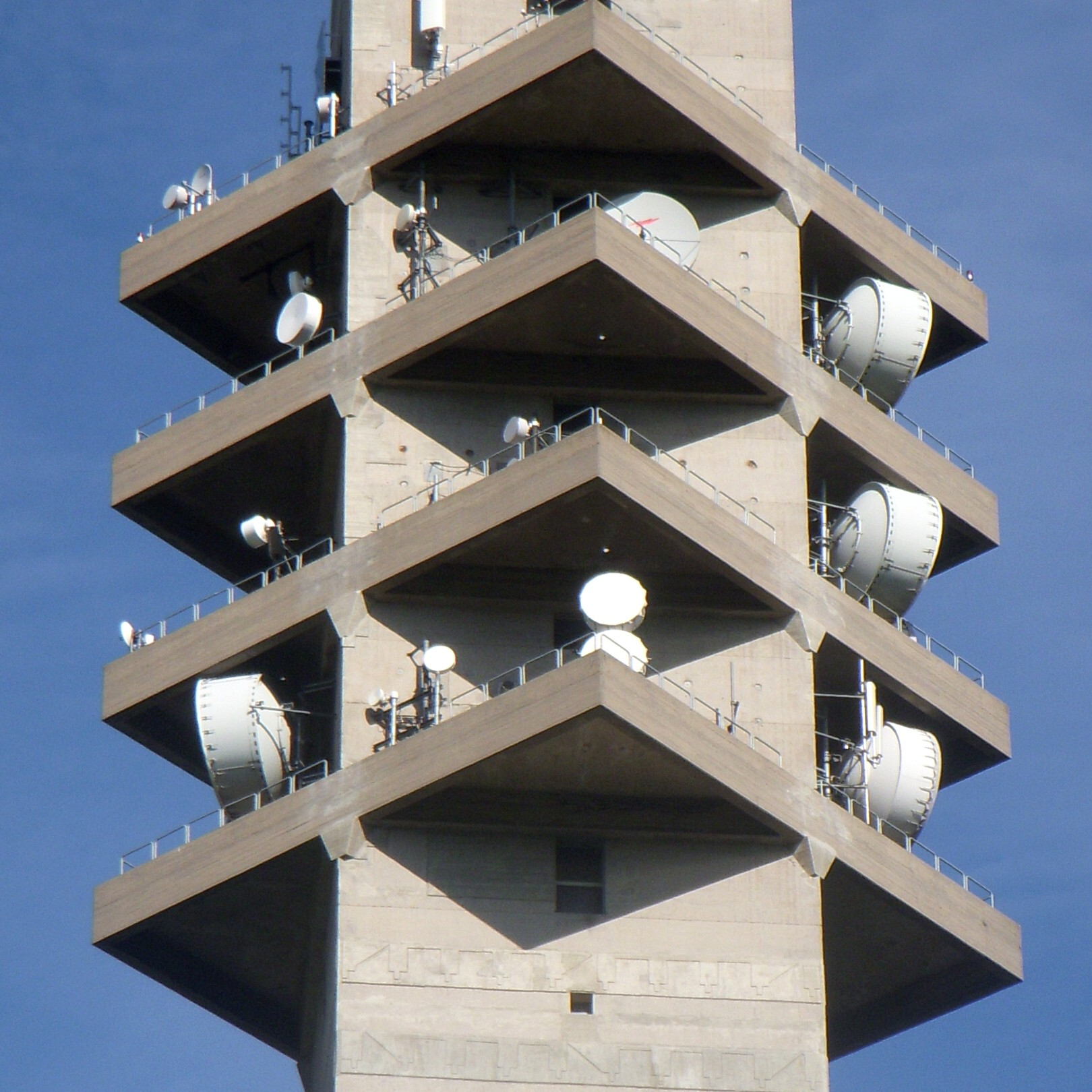
View of platforms with transmitter antennas.

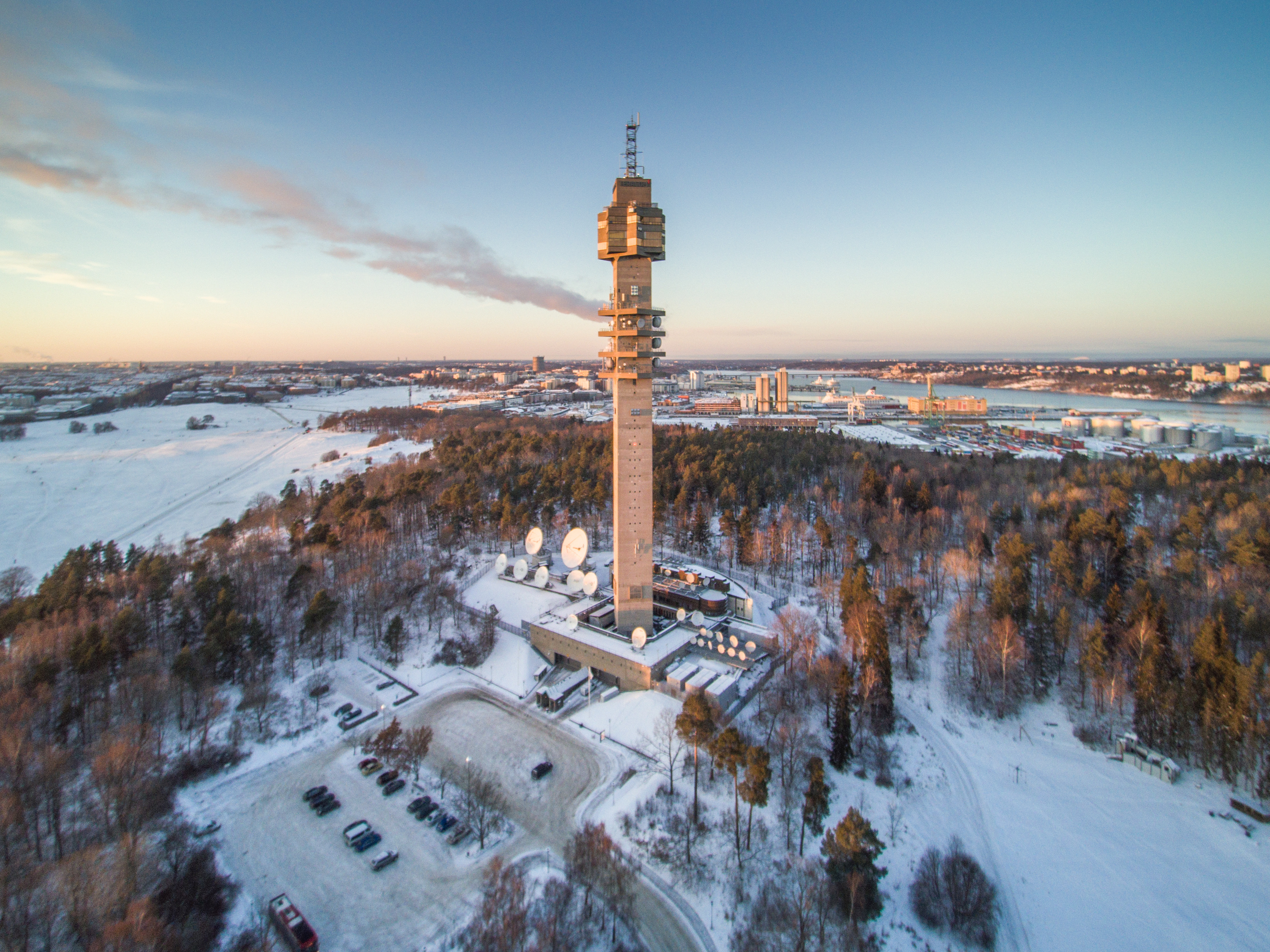
View of the Kaknäs Tower and the transmitter building.

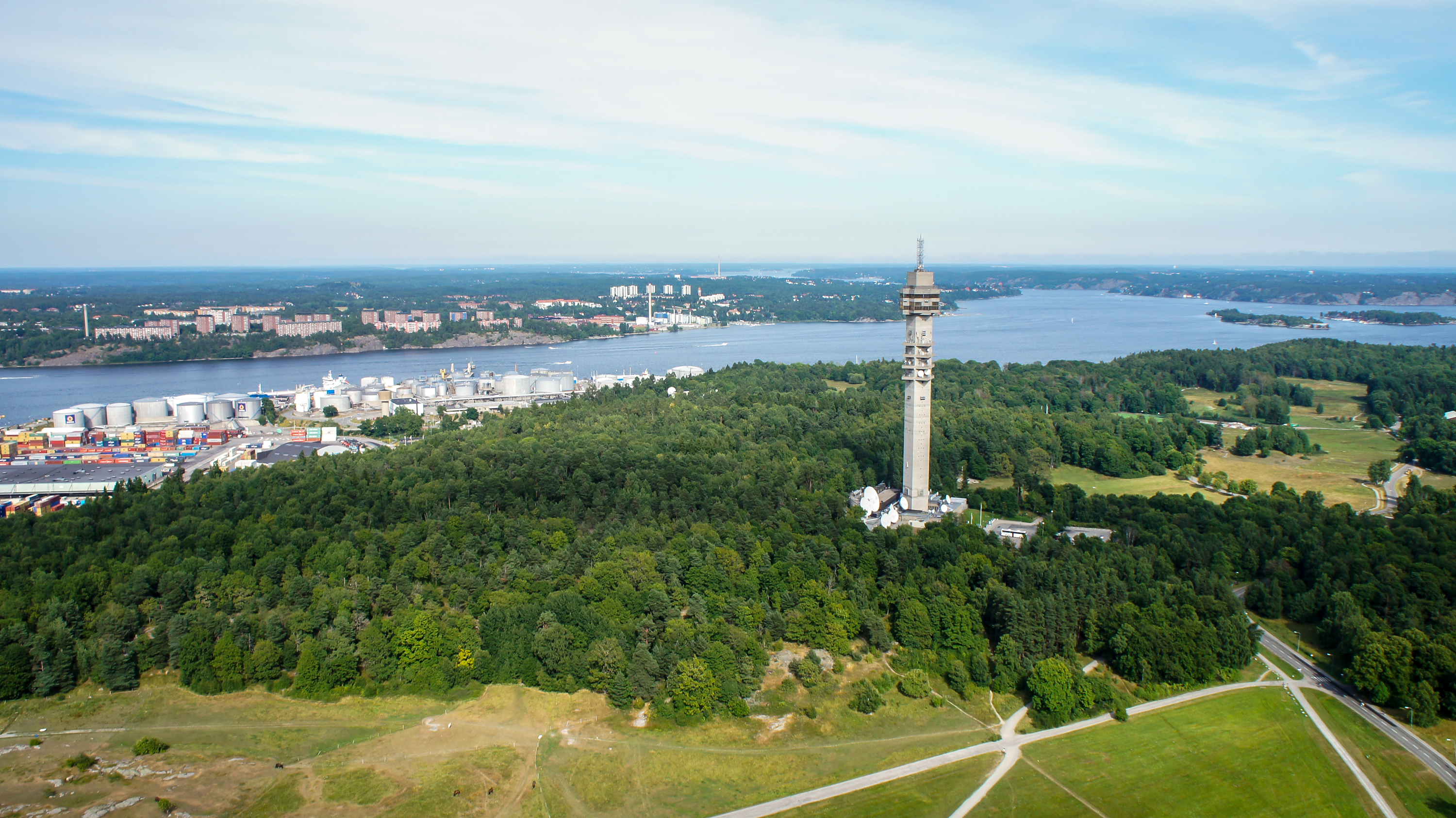
The Kaknäs Tower at Djurgården, with Lilla Värtan in the background.

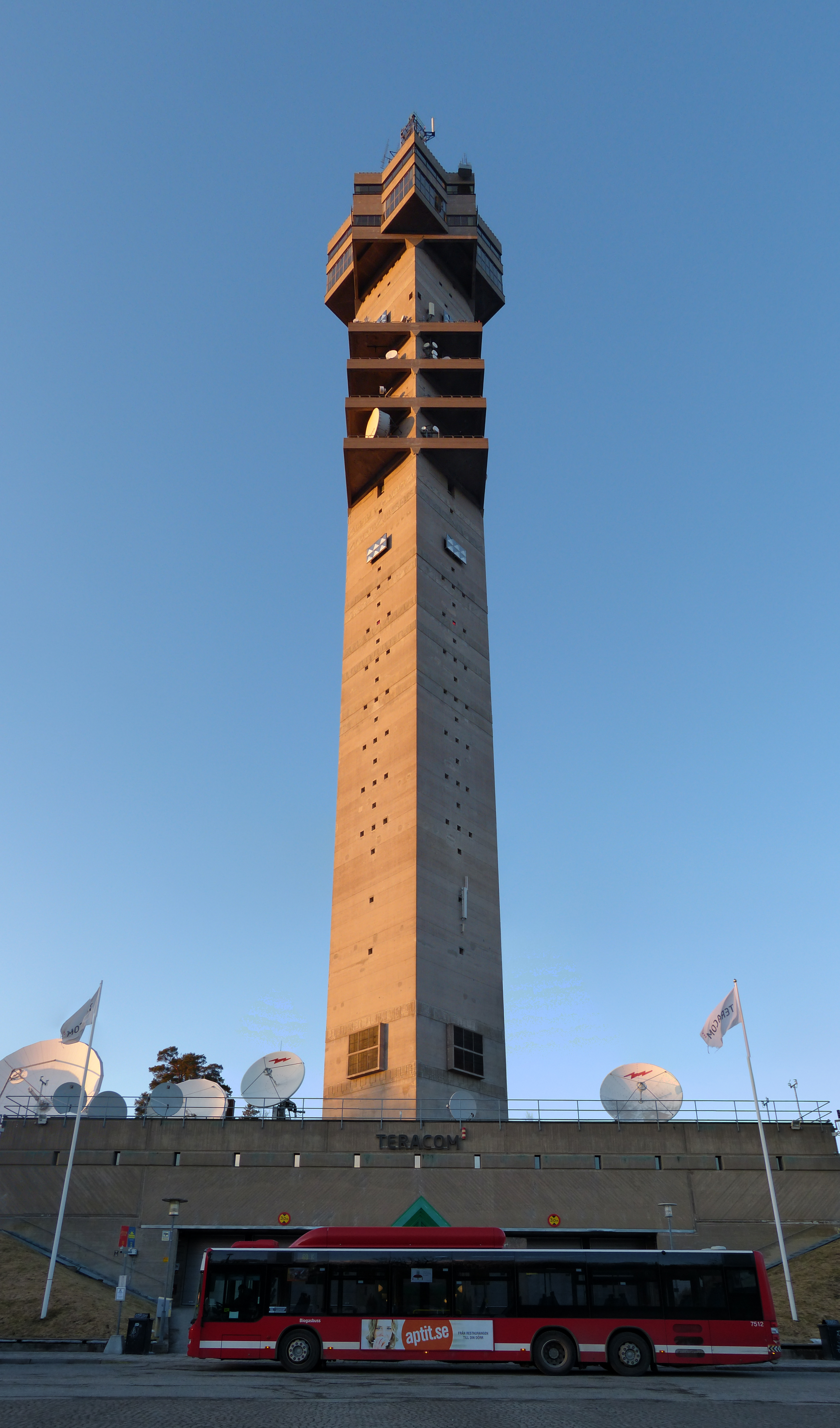
View of the Kaknäs Tower and base.

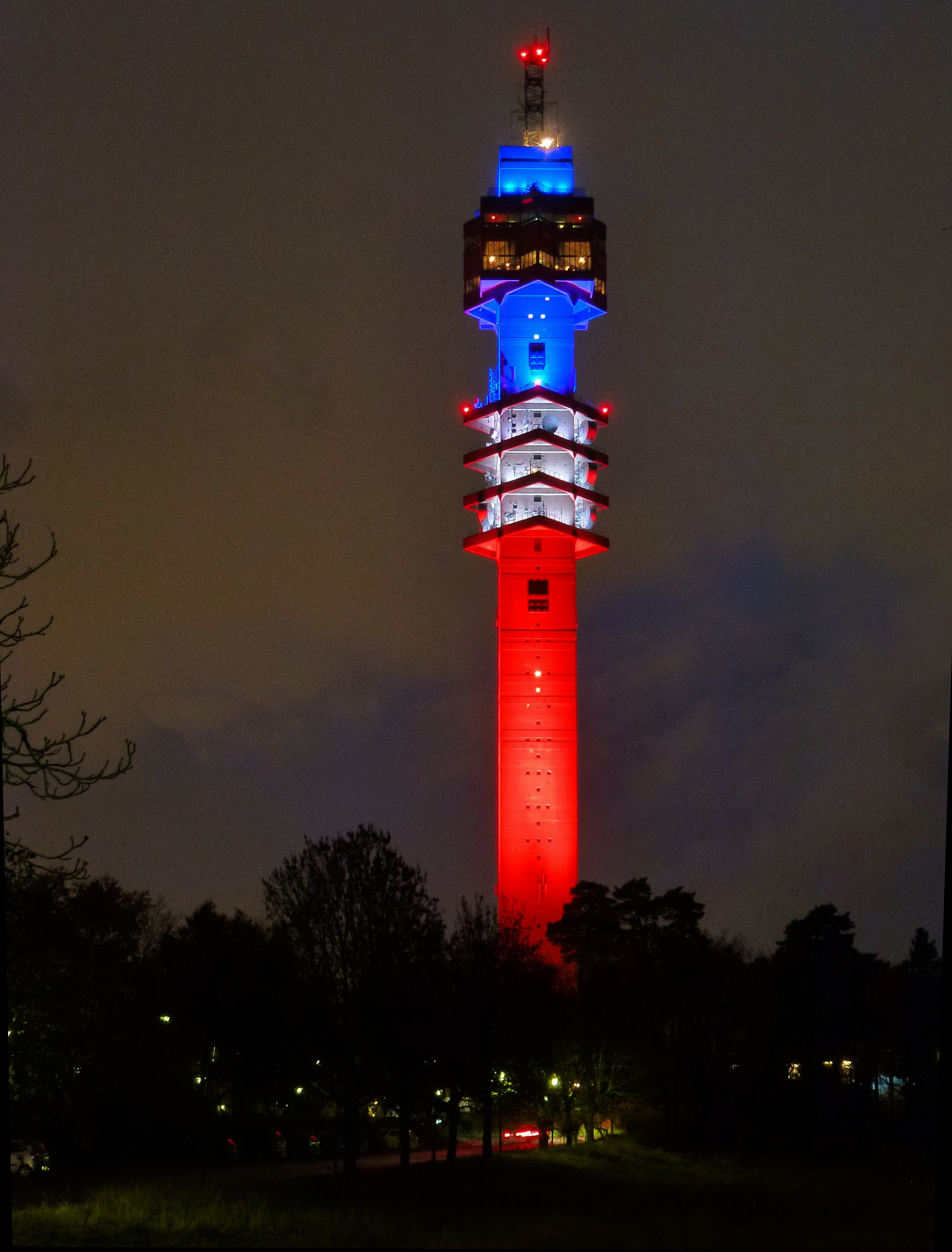
The Kaknäs Tower illuminated in the colours of the French flag in memorial to the November 2015 Paris attacks.
Views from the observation deck

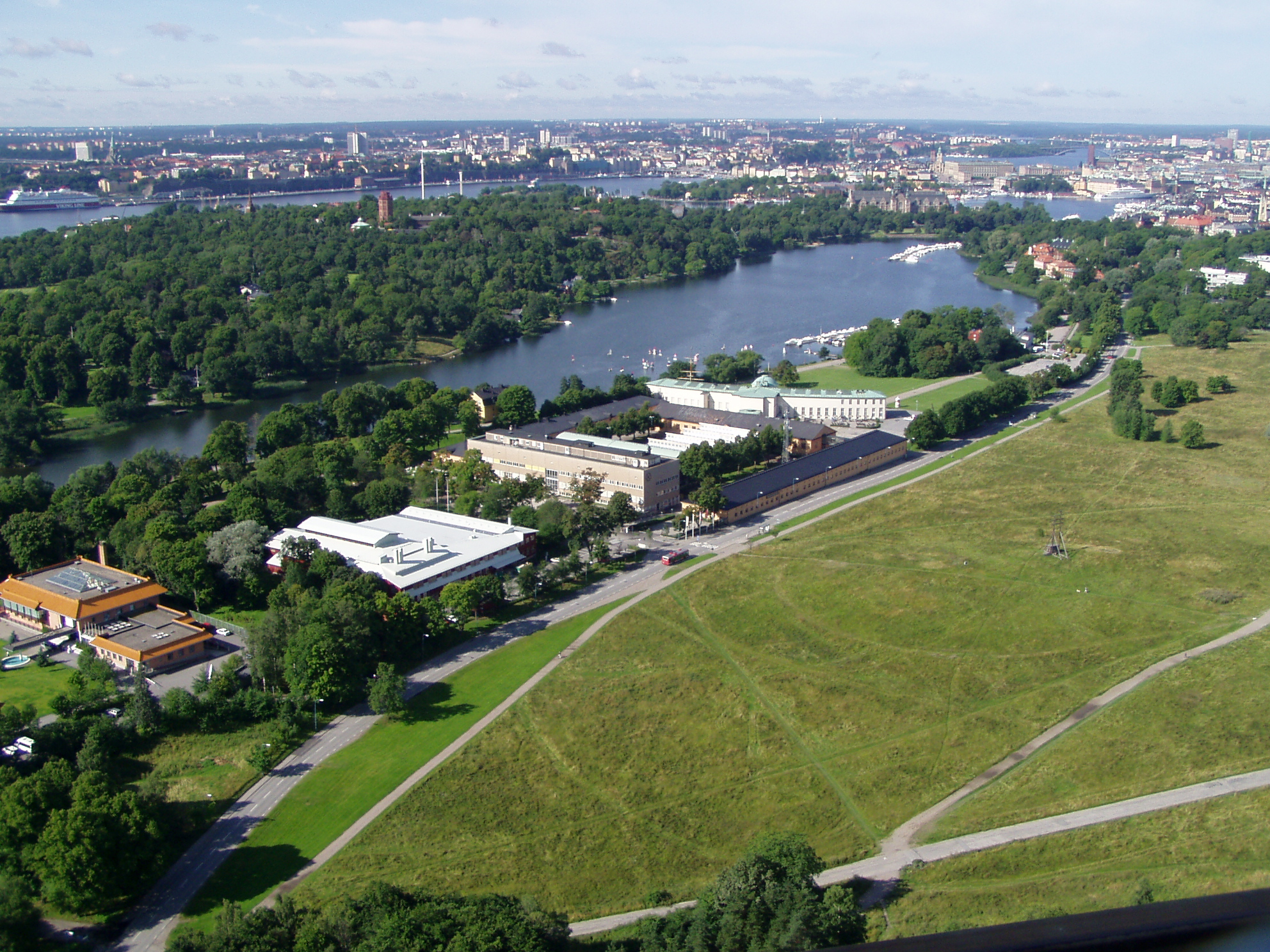
View south-west towards Djurgårdsbrunnsviken.

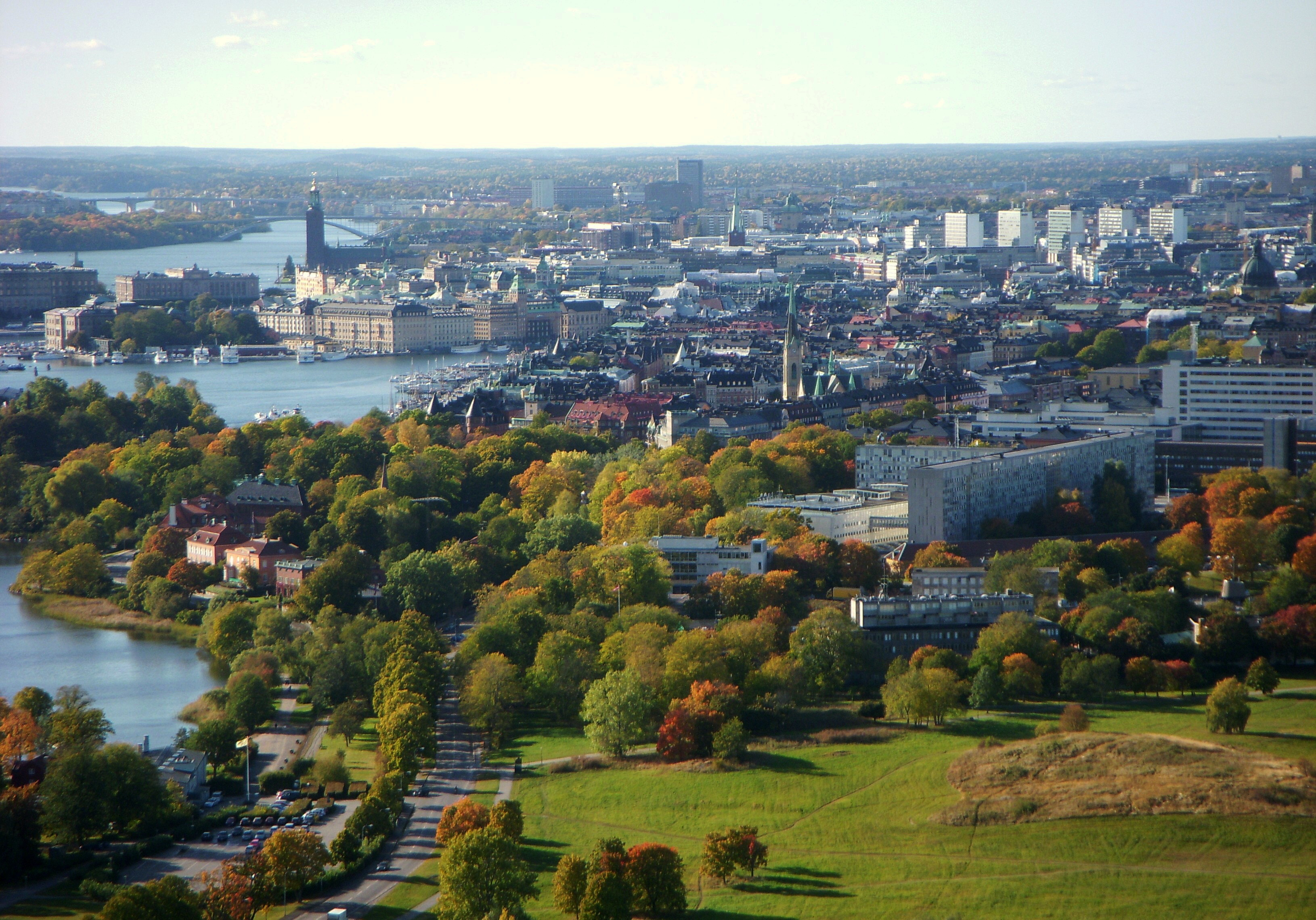
View west towards Stockholm city.

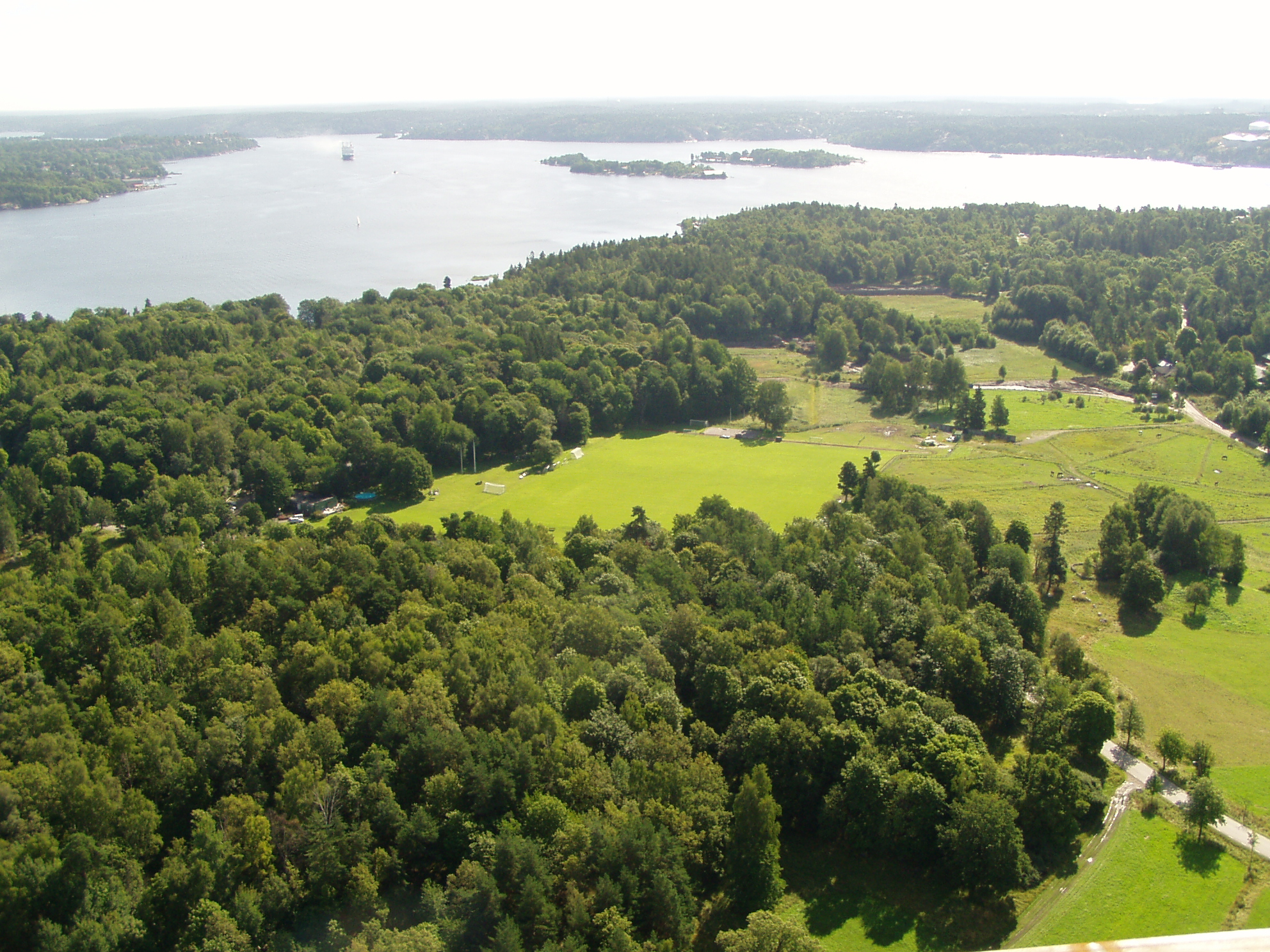
View east towards Djurgården and Fjäderholmarna.

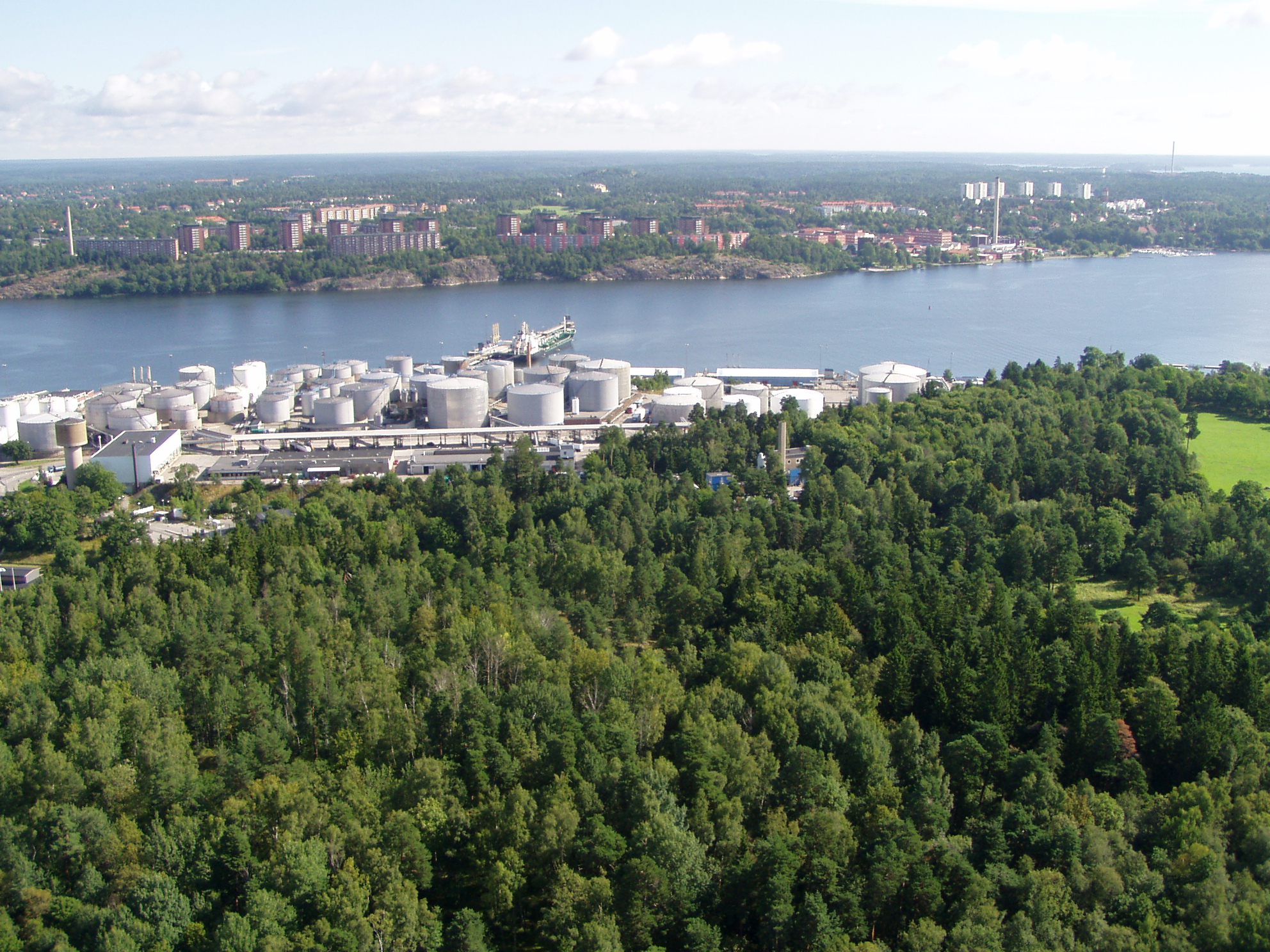
View north towards Loudden and Lidingö.
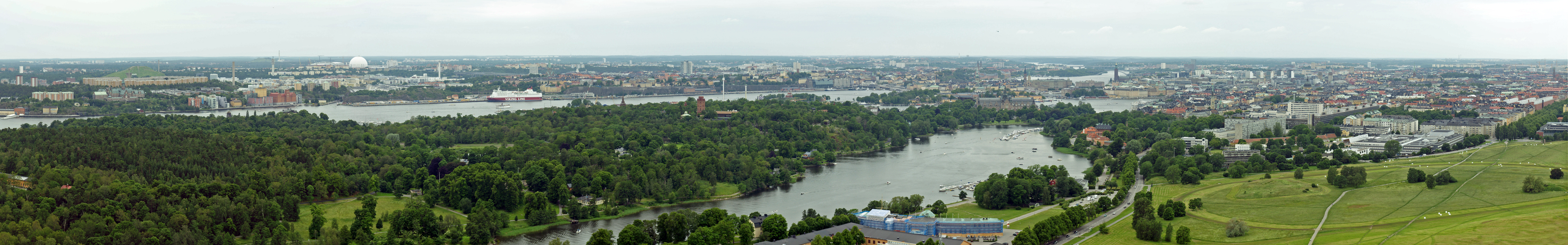
Panoramic view from Kaknäs Tower towards the city centre.

== See also ==
- Architecture of Stockholm
