= Student Union at the Royal Institute of Technology =

Swedish student union

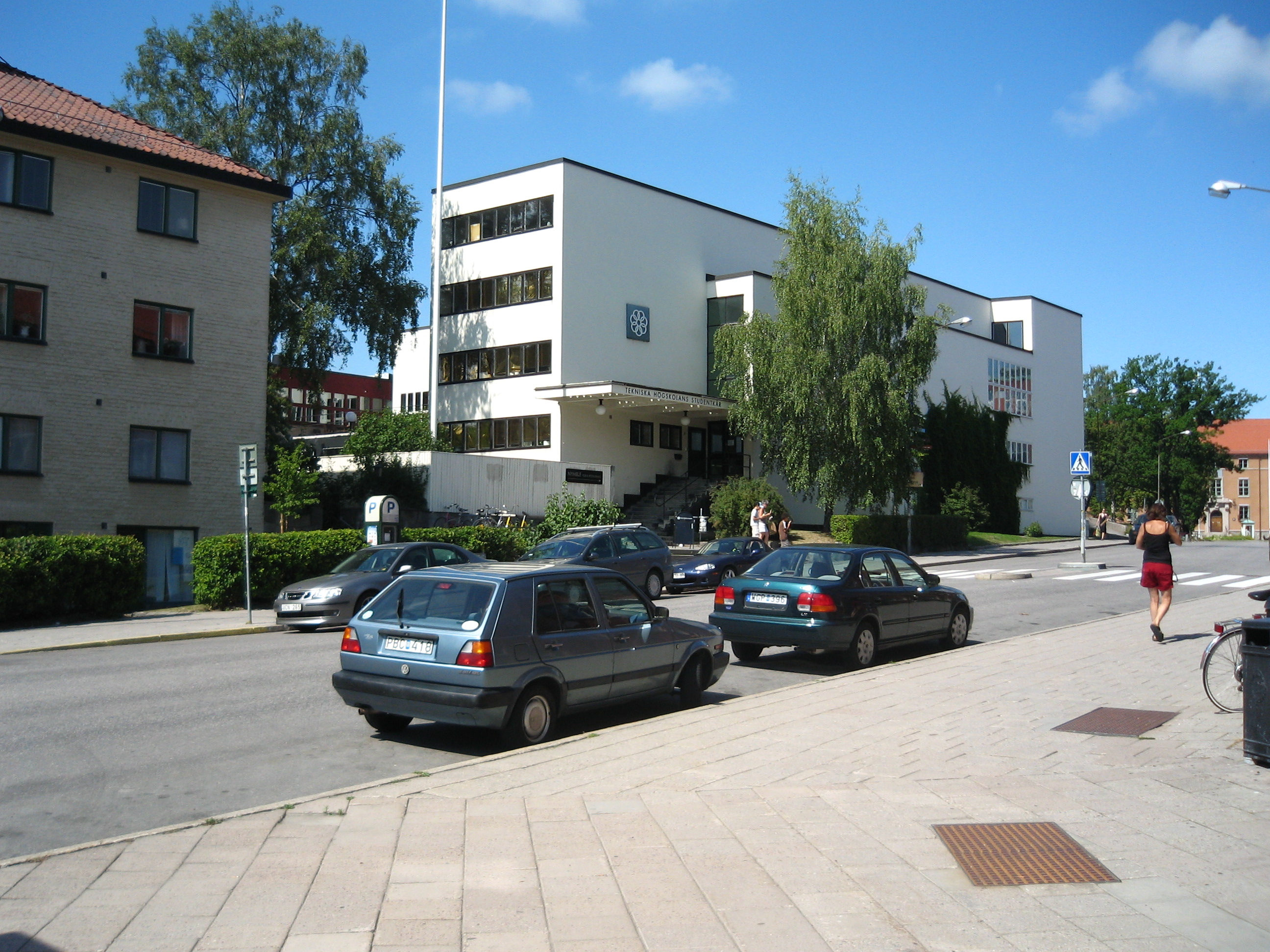
Nymble, the building of the student union

The Student Union at the Royal Institute of Technology (Tekniska Högskolans Studentkår or THS) is the students' union at the Royal Institute of Technology in Stockholm, Sweden. It is affiliated with the Stockholm Federation of Student Unions.

The student union was founded on 26 November 1901. The union building Nymble was designed by leading Swedish modernists Uno Åhrén and Sven Markelius in 1928 and inaugurated in 1930; it is significant as one of the first examples of modernist architecture in Sweden and has status as a listed building.

The student union has a governing chamber of delegates elected by the students at the Institute and a board and other officials elected by the delegates. The union appoints student representatives to various boards of the institute.

The members of THS are divided into chapters or "sections" of the union. Each chapter corresponds to a number of programs (bachelor, master or doctoral) at the Royal Institute of Technology. Each chapter has its own management and arranges a reception for new students. The chapters or sections of THS are:

Identifier	Chapter/Section	Chapter jurisdiction	English language programs part of chapter
A	Arkitektursektionen	Architecture students	Architecture; Architectural Lighting Design
B	Bergssektionen	Material Sciences students	Engineering Materials Science
CL	Sektionen för Civilingenjör och Lärare	Students in Civil Engineering and Teaching educations	None
D	Datasektionen	Computer Science students	Computer Science; Cybersecurity; Machine Learning
Dr	Doktorandsektionen	Ph.D. Students	All Ph.D. Programs
E	Elektrosektionen	Electrical Engineering students	Electric Power Engineering; Electromagnetics, Fusion and Space Engineering; Information and Network Engineering; Nanotechnology; Systems, Control and Robotics
F	Fysiksektionen	Physics and Math students	Applied and Computational Mathematics; Engineering Physics; Nuclear Energy Engineering
Fria	Fria sektionen	Students not belonging to any other program	None
I	Sektionen för Industriell Ekonomi	Students in Industrial Economics	Technology-based Entrepreneurship
IT	Sektionen för Informationsteknik	Students in Information and Nanotechnology	Information and Communication Technology (Bachelor); Communication Systems; Embedded Systems; ICT Innovation; Software Engineering of Distributed Systems
IsB	Ingenjörssektionen Bygg	Construction Engineering students	None
IsF	Ingenjörssektionen Flemingsberg	Engineering Students at the Flemingsberg campus	None
K	Kemisektionen	Chemistry Students	Chemical Engineering for Energy and Environment; Industrial and Environmental Biotechnology; Macromolecular Materials; Medical Biotechnology; Molecular Science and Engineering; Molecular Techniques in Life Science
M	Kungliga Maskinsektionen	Industrial Engineering and Management students	Engineering Design; Industrial Management; Integrated Product Design; Production Engineering and Management
Media	Sektionen för Medieteknik	Media Technology students	Interactive Media Technology
MiT	Sektionen för Medicinsk Teknik	Medical Technology students	Medical Engineering; Sports Technology; Technology, Work and Health
OPEN	Sektionen för Öppen ingång	Students in open entrance program	None
S	Samhällsbyggnadssektionen	Students in Urban Development programs	Civil and Architectural Engineering; Environmental Engineering and Sustainable Infrastructure; Real Estate and Construction Management; Sustainable Urban Planning and Design; Transport and Geoinformation Technology
T	Flygsektionen	Mechanical Engineering students	Aerospace Engineering; Computer Simulations for Science and Engineering; Engineering Mechanics; Naval Architecture; Railway Engineering; Vehicle Engineering
TBas	Sektionen för Tekniskt Basår	Students enrolled in a technical prep year	None
P	Produktionssektionen	Students in programs that previously belonged at the Södertälje campus	Sustainable Production Development
W	Sektionen för Energi och miljö	Students in Energy and Environmental Sustainability	Sustainable Technology; Sustainable Energy Engineering

== See also ==
- Blandaren
- Chalmers Students' Union
