= Niels Diffrient =

American industrial designer (1928–2013)

Niels Diffrient HonRDI
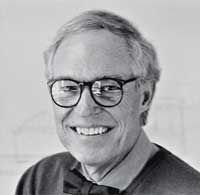
- Born: 6 September 1928; Rankin County, Mississippi, United States
- Died: 8 June 2013 (aged 84); Ridgefield, Connecticut, United States
- Education: Cass Technical High School; Wayne State University; Cranbrook Academy of Art
- Occupation: Industrial designer
- Spouse: Helena Hernmarck

Niels Diffrient (6 September 1928 – 8 June 2013) was an American industrial designer. Diffrient focused mainly on ergonomic seating, and his most well known designs are the Freedom and Liberty chairs, manufactured by Humanscale.

== Biography ==
Diffrient was born in 1928 in a farmhouse near Star, Mississippi.

During the Great Depression his family relocated to Detroit, where Diffrient attended Cass Technical High School. He then attended Wayne State University, and finally Cranbrook Academy of Art, where he received a Bachelor of Fine Arts in architecture and excelled as an outstanding student, winning the First Medal in Design three of his four years there.

While in Italy on a Fulbright Scholarship in 1954, Diffrient went to work in the studio of the great architect Marco Zanuso, where he assisted with the design of an award-winning Borletti sewing machine.

Upon arriving back in the United States in 1955, Diffrient joined Dreyfuss Associates in their Pasadena offices, and spent the next few decades revolutionizing American industrial design through his development of interiors and corporate identity for American Airlines planes, the landmark Princess telephone, the Polaroid SX-70 camera, and tractor operator cabs for John Deere. In 1980 after 25 years with Henry Dreyfuss Associates, Diffrient left to start his own independent practice, establishing a design studio in Ridgefield, Connecticut which he shared with his second wife, tapestry artist Helena Hernmarck.

In his career, which lasted over a half century, Diffrient designed every type of equipment, as well as computers, exhibits, trucks, airplane interiors and corporate identity programs. He has also been broadly published in the field of design and human factors, most notably as co-author of the three-volume publication, Humanscale, in 1974 and 1981. He is credited with pioneering the use of ergonomics, or what he called human factors engineering, in dozens of office furniture designs.

Additionally, Niels spent time as adjunct Professor of Design at UCLA for eight years and was a visiting critic at the Yale University School of Architecture for two years.

Articles about him and his work have appeared in Time, Fortune, Business Week and The New York Times to name a few.

Diffrient died on 8 June 2013 at his home in Ridgefield, Connecticut.

== Awards ==
In the field of furniture design, most notably ergonomic seating, Diffrient won a total of 24 awards, including two Best of Show and 10 Gold and Top awards. He cited in more than 46 design and utility patents on furniture designs in America and abroad. Other honors include the I.D. Top 40 Design Innovators of 1996, the 1996 Chrysler Award for Innovation, the Smithsonian’s 2002 Cooper-Hewitt National Design Award for Product Design, and the 2005 Legend Award from Contract magazine. In 2007, Forbes.com named Diffrient the "granddaddy of the ergonomic revolution" and one of ten "Tastemakers" in the field of industrial design. In 1987 he was appointed an Honorary Royal Designer for Industry (RDI) by the Royal Society for Arts (RSA) in London. In 2012, he received a Lifetime Contribution to Design Award and FX Magazine International Interior Design Awards.

== Products designed by Niels Diffrient ==
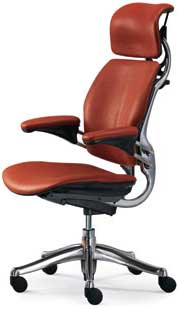
Humanscale's Freedom Chair

=== Humanscale ===
Humanscale is an American company based in New York City, best known for its Freedom chair designed by Niels Diffrient and introduced in 1999.

Chairs:

- Freedom Chair, 1999: The chair was considered innovative for its internal counterbalance mechanism that allegedly supports the user’s body at all points during recline, a first for task chairs. The Freedom chair has patented synchronous arms, which adjust simultaneously. The headrest tilts forward as the sitter reclines, keeping the head in an upright position.
- Liberty Chair, 2004: Humanscale’s other notable task chair is its Liberty chair, also designed by Niels Diffrient, which was introduced in 2004. The Liberty chair is a tri-panel mesh back design, which allegedly provides lumbar support. Like the Freedom chair, Liberty is also outfitted with a balanced recline mechanism that is supposed to support all sitters throughout recline.
- Diffrient World Chair, 2009

Humanscale also manufactures keyboard support systems, monitor arms, task lighting, and various other ergonomic work tools, including:

- Diffrient Task and Work Light, 2002

=== Other ===
- Diffrient Chair (Knoll), 1979
- Helena Chair and Jefferson Chair (SunarHauserman), 1984
- Flexible Workspace Furniture System (KI), 1998
- John Deere tractors (Henry Dreyfuss)
- Borletti Sewing Machine (Marco Zanuso)

== Publications ==
- Diffrient, Niels. Humanscale: Manual. Cambridge, Mass: MIT Press, 1974. Print.
- Diffrient, Niels, Mildred S. Friedman, Joan Bardagjy, and Nicholas Polites. Dimensions of Experience: Understanding and Measuring Human Experience in the Designed Environment. Minneapolis, Minn: Walker Art Center, 1975. Print.
- Diffrient, Niels. Confessions of a Generalist. Danbury, Conn.: Generalist Ink, LLC, 2012. Print. ISBN 978-0-578-11241-1
- Lutz, Brian. Eero Saarinen: Furniture for Everyman. New York: Pointed Leaf Press, 2012. Print.
- Pedersen, Martin C. "Niels Diffrient." Metropolis: Architecture Design 32.8 (2013): 88. Biography Reference Bank (H.W. Wilson). Web. December 10, 2015.
