= Uno Åhrén =

Swedish architect and city planner

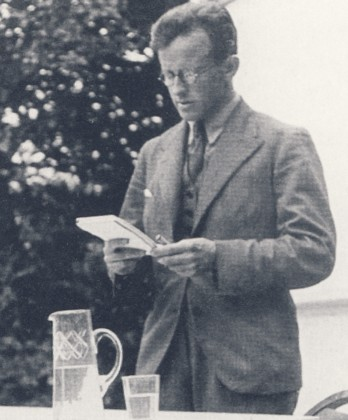
Åhrén, circa 1930

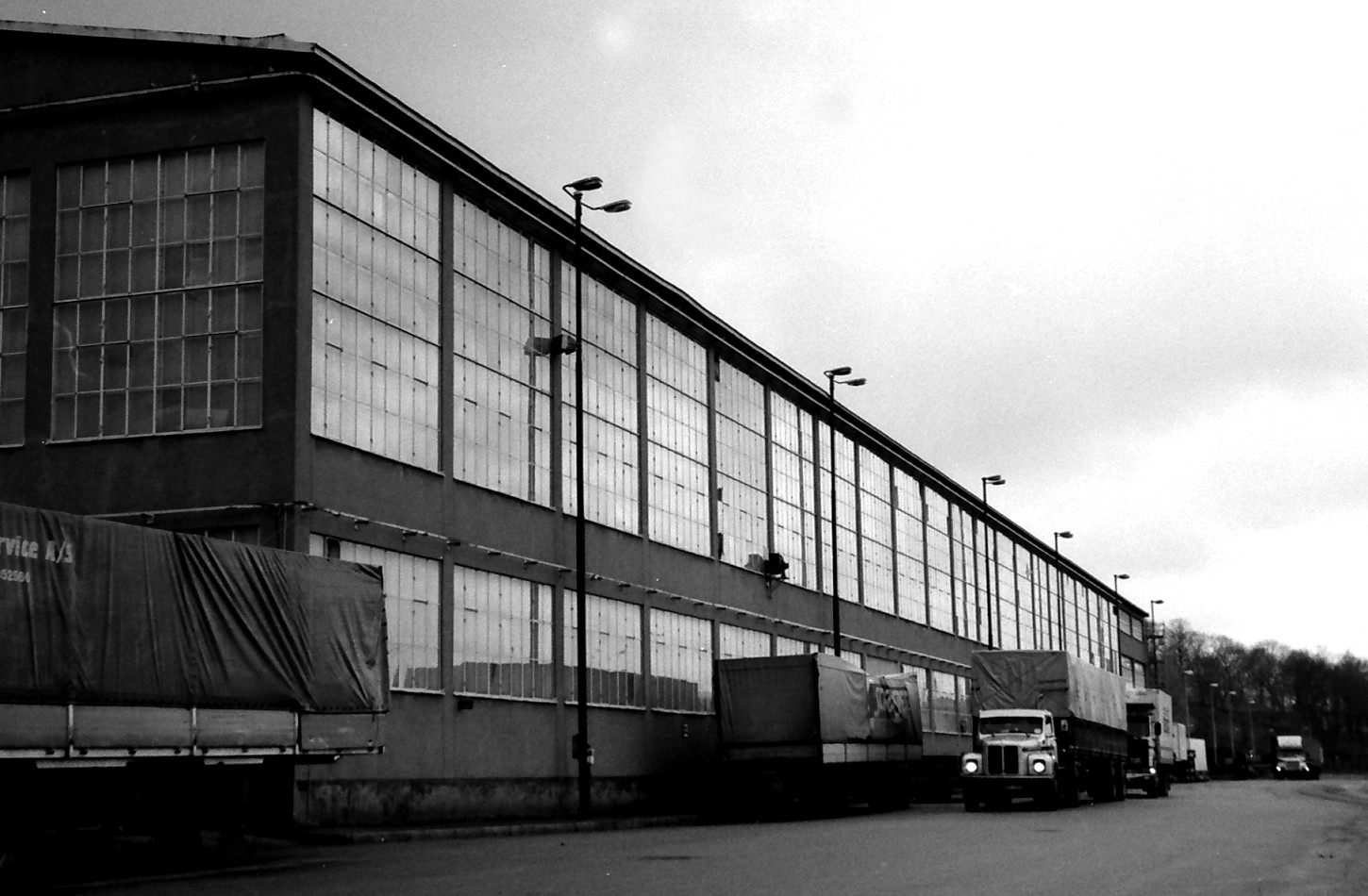
Ford Motor Company Building, 1930

Uno Åhrén (6 August 1897 – 8 October 1977) was a Swedish architect and city planner, and a leading proponent of functionalism in Sweden.

== Biography ==
Uno Emrik Åhrén was born in Stockholm, Sweden. He graduated as an architect at the KTH Royal Institute of Technology in Stockholm in 1918. He was City Planning Manager in Gothenburg 1932-1943 and head of the Riksbyggen 1943-1945. He was appointed professor of urban construction at the Royal Institute of Technology from 1947 through 1963.

In 1930 Åhrén was one of the designers for the Housing Exhibition of the Stockholm International Exhibition, and in 1931 he was one of the six co-authors of the 1931 manifesto, Acceptera, a plea for acceptance of functionalism, standardization, and mass production as a cultural change in Sweden.

Åhrén collaborated with the sociologist, reformer and Nobel Memorial Prize in Economic Sciences winner Gunnar Myrdal from 1932 though 1935 on a social housing commission, and in 1934 they co-authored The Housing Question as a Social Planning Problem, a work that would prove influential in the structuring of the Swedish Social Democratic Party, the Folkhemmet.

Åhrén died at Arvika during 1977.

== Work ==
- Student Union at the Royal Institute of Technology, Stockholm, 1928-1930, with Sven Markelius
- Ford Motor Company, Stockholm, 1930–31
- Flamman Soundfilm Theatre, Hornstull, Stockholm, 1930
- Terrace houses in Norra Ängby, Bromma, Stockholm, 1931–40
- Chief City Planner for Gothenburg, 1932–1943
- Årsta centrum, Stockholm 1943–53
- Chief for the housing cooperative Riksbyggen 1943–1945

== See also ==
- Social engineering (political science)
