= Acceptera =

acceptera
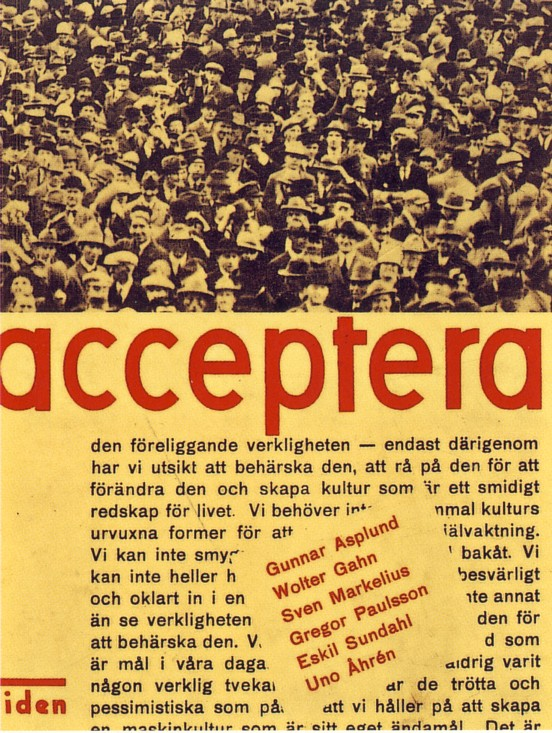
- Cover of the first edition
- Author: Gunnar Asplund, Wolter Gahn, Sven Markelius, Eskil Sundahl, and Uno Åhrén
- Language: Swedish
- Genre: Architecture
- Publication date: 1931
- Publication place: Sweden

acceptera (1931) is a Swedish modern architecture manifesto written by architects Gunnar Asplund, Wolter Gahn, Sven Markelius, Eskil Sundahl, Uno Åhrén, and art historian Gregor Paulsson. Claiming that Swedish “building-art” (byggnadskonst) has failed to keep pace with the revolutionary social and technological change sweeping Europe in the early 20th century, the authors argue that the production of housing and consumer goods must embrace a functionalist orientation in order to meet the particular cultural and material needs of both modern society and the modern individual. Combining social analysis with an iconoclastic critique of contemporary architecture and handicraft, acceptera ardently calls upon its readers not to shrink back from modernity, but rather to “accept the reality that exists—only in that way have we any prospect of mastering it, taking it in hand, and altering it to create a culture that offers an adaptable tool for life.”

The manifesto was written in connection with, and published shortly after, the 1930 Stockholm Exhibition. The exhibition, which was directed in part by Asplund and featured contributions by each of the authors, offered a variety of structures representative of the functionalist and International styles. It took as its slogan the phrase Acceptera!—translatable into English as either the imperative “accept!” or the infinitive “to accept!”

Together, the Stockholm Exhibition and publication of acceptera constitute a definitive moment in the development of Swedish modern architecture and urban planning, both of which would be influenced in the following decades by many of the ideas regarding industrial production, planning, standardization, and functionality promulgated by the manifesto’s authors.

== Historical Context and Authorship ==
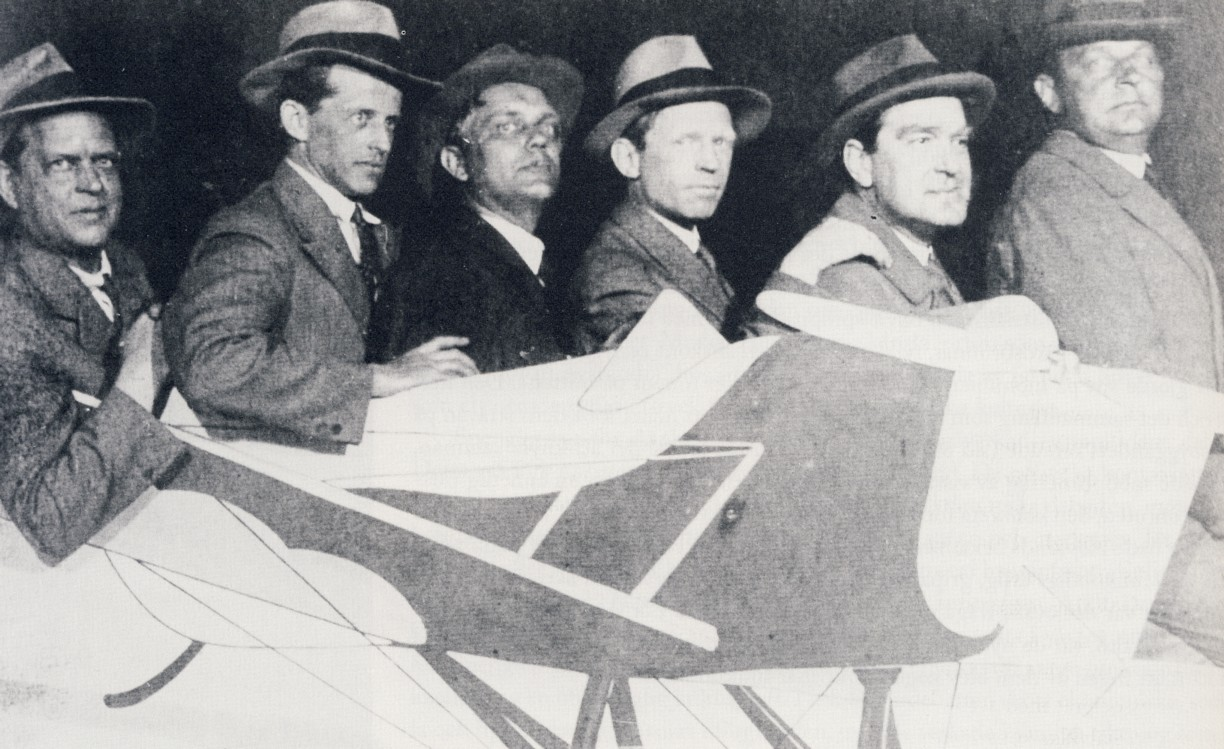
Architects Sven Markelius, Uno Åhrén, Gunnar Asplund, Eskil Sundahl, Wolter Gahn and art historian Gregor Paulsson

The plan to compose a functionalist manifesto developed during the Stockholm Exhibition, and its writing began before the conclusion of that event in September 1930. Each of acceptera’s authors played a role in the organization of the exhibition, and the manifesto figured largely as an attempt to further elaborate on the functionalist style and philosophy which they had hoped to model in its pavilions for the Swedish public. The manifesto might therefore be read as both an attempt to clarify the key tenets of functionalism and an effort to persuade an undecided public of the dire need to revolutionize design and construction.

Despite the iconoclastic nature of acceptera and its bold use of social and architectural theory for justifying the modernization of Swedish architecture, the authors “were hardly radical interlopers on the Stockholm cultural scene”. Gahn, Sundahl, and Markelius were accomplished, modernist architects. Asplund, a representative of the pseudo-modernist Nordic Classicism school, was famous for his design of the Stockholm Public Library. Åhrén, also an established architect and urban planner, would later become the collaborator of Nobel Prize-winning sociologist Gunnar Myrdal, when the two co-wrote "The Housing Question as a Social Planning Problem" in 1934. Paulsson, the group’s only non-architect, was director of the Swedish Arts and Crafts Society (Svenska Slöjdföreningen). Together, these six men made up the “new establishment” in 1930s Swedish architecture, and in the collective spirit of the work, they wrote acceptera as a group, leaving the details of the authorial division of labor largely uncertain.

acceptera was initially printed in 1931 and distributed by Tidens förlag, the publishing arm of the Swedish Social Democratic Party. It was re-issued in 1980 and published in an English translation for the first time in 2008.

== Structure and Style ==
acceptera consists of twelve sections. The text is arranged alongside photomontage, photographs, illustrations, and statistics in a creative, almost playful way. Many of the images feature humorous or ironic captions, which mock, for example, anti-modernist conceptions of work or home-life. Throughout the text, the authors emphasize and draw attention to key points by using bold font or arranging words in novel ways on the page.

== Key Ideas ==
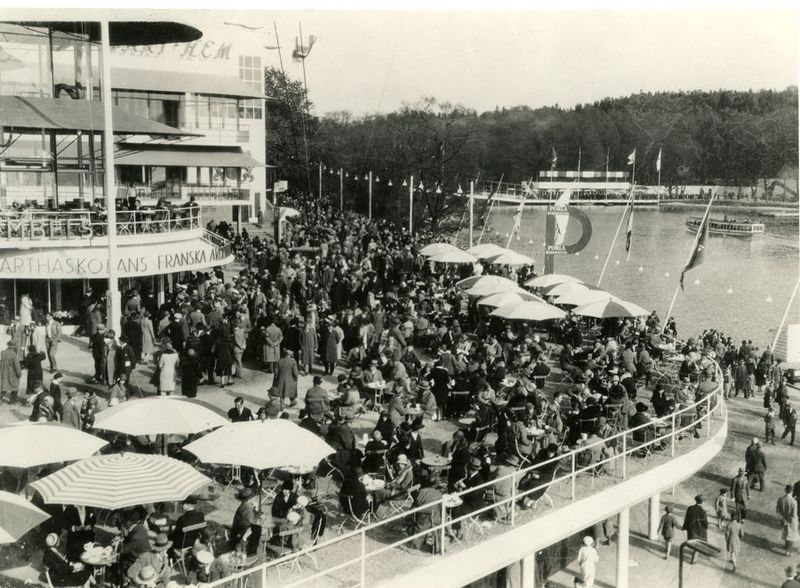
Visitors at the Stockholm Exhibition

=== Dualities of Modernity ===
On the first page of the "acceptera", the authors present a number the “either/or” propositions they believe characterize contemporary social thinking. Countering the notion that one might actually solve social problems through choosing one option, however, they argue that both quantity and quality, both the mass and the individual must inform the solutions to contemporary problems. Throughout acceptera, the authors posit the existence of numerous fundamental binaries—i.e. industrial production vs. handicraft—which they attempt to overcome through conceptualizing the objectives of architecture and industrial design from the functionalist perspective.

=== Objectivity and Aesthetic Values ===
The authors question how the contradictory anthropological theories of family proffered by Lewis Henry Morgan, Edvard Westermarck, and Robert Briffault could have all been acknowledged as true at different times and in different societies. Arguing that the theory of each resonated with a specific hegemonic intellectual paradigm and lost favor only when this paradigm was no longer fashionable, they claim that it is in fact the conformity of the idea to dominant values and ideology—and not any actual claim to verifiable truth—which constitutes the source of its popularity. This lack of objective thinking about society is a problem, however, because within the realm of social policy it obscures necessary solutions to pressing issues. This distortion causes people to yearn for a romanticized past when the issue in question had allegedly not yet come into existence, exacerbating the current situation.

Furthermore, the authors note that, despite widespread recognition of cultural change, people continue to cling to styles and forms from other eras. Even in the midst of industrialization, certain anachronistic aesthetic values survive and even flourish. For the authors, the radical novelty of the present social conditions must be accepted as a true departure from the past, and “building-art”, which has lagged behind other cultural activities, must be revolutionized in order to develop in ways which had been, until the emergence of these conditions, impossible. They also sought to show that this pragmatic orientation to modernity is not some import from elsewhere or a philosophical innovation, but rather is a particularly domestic approach rooted in traditional Swedish values of “straightforwardness, moderation, and friendliness".

=== A-Europe and B-Europe ===
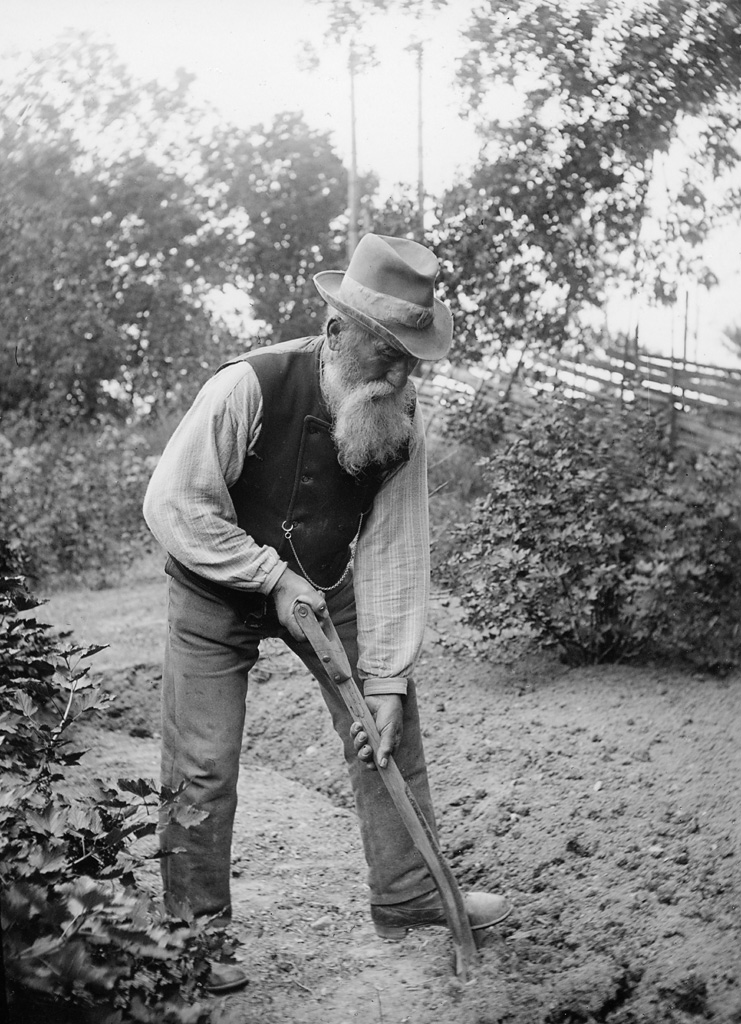
B-Europe: traditional, isolated, anachronistic

In outlining the epochal shifts which shaped modern European society, the authors describe the continent as consisting of two irreconcilable but nevertheless interdependent domains: “A-Europe” and “B-Europe”. A-Europe, they argue, is made up of the industrialized urban centers and towns of the continent which are linked by railroad, and through which the most striking evidence of modernization is visible. Unlike B-Europe, it has been remade in modernity and “resembles a great organism in which all the functions are at the same time specialized and centralized and where all the cells, from the solitary farm to the immense factory or bank, are dependent on each other”.

In contrast, B-Europe is made up of the isolated agricultural communities whose major cultural patterns have largely remained the same through the past few centuries. It is unorganized and fragmented, standing beside unified A-Europe as “an amalgam of autonomous undertakings and alternating ethnic groups with no other unifying forces than religion and the powers-that-be, the latter often only by virtue over their swords”. Bringing this division closer to home, the authors describe Sweden itself as a combination of “Sweden-then” and “Sweden-now”.

For the purposes of the manifesto, the most critical outcome of this sociocultural division of Europe into its “A” and “B” aspects is the fact that the demographic, technological, and social transformations in A-Europe are “creating a new world” and “a new type of individual” who require “building-art” shaped “according to the conditions that have created them”.

=== Utility, Function, Style ===
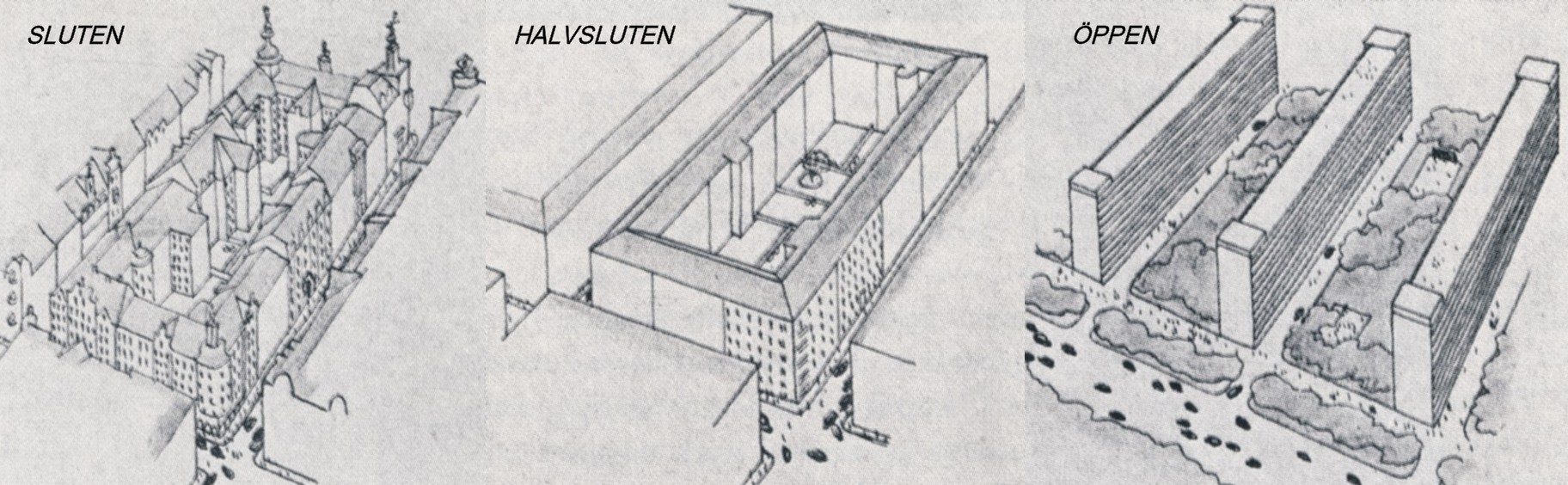
The evolution of the housing block, from the old closed design (sluten) to the open design of the future (öppen)

In addition to outlining the unique sociocultural situation in Europe, the authors interrogate received conceptions of art, utility, and meaning. Arguing that the contemporary home has been fundamentally changed by technological, social, and cultural developments, they argue that its design must reflect new ways people live in and use their dwellings, as well as new standards for hygiene, spaciousness, and value. Answering popular claims that functionalism seeks to deprive the home of its charm and comfort, they argue that “If we furnish our home with the things we really need, the selection will be an expression of the life in the home as we live it”. Further, they reject the notion that the home becomes a source of enjoyment based purely on its uniqueness, claiming that comfort is largely the product of organization, order, and functionality.

Meaning in “building-art”—whether in the construction of housing or consumer goods—they believe, is a product of authenticity. The authentic form in the present time is that developed in accordance with utility. They therefore criticize the popular and anachronistic—they claim—distinction made between art and utility. They argue that, in fact, machines and other supposedly technical objects contain a unique artistic quality embodied in the fulfillment of their function. In their minds, people must achieve a state in which they "no longer conceive of the aesthetic as something that comes from above to merge with the technical, which is of lower origin, but regard every form that does not offer a satisfactory expression of its function as quite simply deficient”.

“Our requirements are more modest but at the same time more responsible: buildings, furniture, drinking glasses may well be consumer items that we can destroy without regret after they have served for some short or long period, but while we use them we expect them to fulfill their role and serve us perfectly, so perfectly that we can also derive aesthetic enjoyment from observing them in use.”

— acceptera, p.181-182

=== Standardization and Industrial Production ===
Investigating the issue of quality vs. quantity, the authors argue that only industrial production is both capable and economical enough to provide quality consumer goods and housing for the masses. They recognize however, that people tend to associate industrial production with cheap, low-quality goods and handicraft with rare, luxury products. Still, they believe that both the antipathy for the former and the preference for the latter are rooted in a historical conception of these things which have since become outmoded. Standardization, they claim, is simply another version of the human propensity for the development of "types". Contrary to what people think, it is in fact a timeless process which has occurred seemingly without direction for almost every conceivable object: automobiles, churches, shoes, etc. Still, they recognize that people feel restricted and coerced when forced to choose between types. Their solution to this problem is a general shift in perception, whereby the object is recognized not as a default option, but rather as the pre-selected optimal choice. This, the authors argue, will overcome the antipathy toward standardization, allowing housing, like cars or books, to be standardized and industrially-produced, so that they may be both objects of quality and quantity.

=== Accepting the times ===
The manifesto argues that the forces driving cultural and technological shifts in Sweden are not on some distant horizon, but instead exist in the present and shape social conditions and contingencies which must be accepted—hence, the title—and addressed if “building-art” and modernity are to be reconciled and brought into productive harmony. In the final section, they call for a radical embrace of modernity: “We cannot tiptoe backward away from our own era. Nor can we skip past what troubles and confuses us into a utopian future. We can only look reality in the eye and accept it to be able to master it”.

== Reception and legacy ==
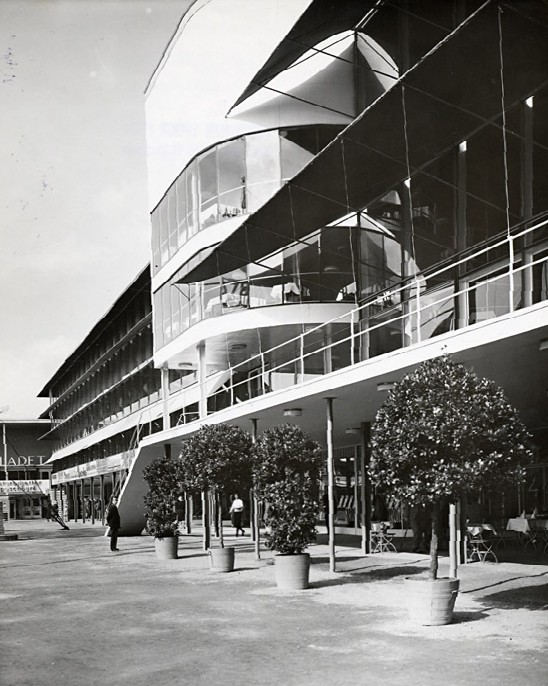
Stockhholm Exhibition 1930

While reaction by the Swedish public and critical establishment to the Stockholm Exhibition was mixed, its ideas would find a wider and more receptive audience by the mid-1930s. acceptera, which embedded these ideas in a playful but trenchant critique of contemporary Swedish architecture, was instrumental in distilling key tenets of the functionalist perspective into a simple imperative: accept. Today, acceptera is considered by many to be the “Swedish manifesto of functionalism”, and its provocative conception of the relationship between architecture, social issues, and cultural change continues to inspire discussion about modernist architecture, as well as social engineering, city planning, and social democracy in 20th century Sweden.

As part of the wider development of modern architecture in Europe in the early 20th century, acceptera can be cited as one of the most influential Swedish contributions to the theory of functionalism. As noted by Mattsson and Wallenstein, however, in the manifesto “modernism was not portrayed to the same extent as a break with tradition, as was the case with the European avant-garde, but rather, as a program to re-connect traditional values to the contemporary development”. Thus, even though acceptera largely comports theoretically with the manifestos and essays written by artists and architects of the European and early Soviet avant-garde, such as Moisei Ginzburg, it figures as a unique contribution, closely fashioned according to the particular sociopolitical conditions of Sweden in the late 1920s and early 1930s.

== Editions ==
- Gunnar Asplund, Wolter Gahn, Sven Markelius, Gregor Paulsson, Eskil Sundahl, Uno Åhrén, acceptera, Tiden, Stockholm, 1931.
- Anders Åman (Ed.) acceptera facsimile, Tiden, Stockholm, 1980.
- Lucy Creagh, Helena Kåberg, Barbara Miller Lane (Eds.), Kenneth Frampton (preword), Modern Swedish design: Three Founding Texts, The Museum of Modern Art, New York, 2008.
- Atli Magnus Seelow (Ed.), Akzeptiere: Das Buch und seine Geschichte. Deutsche Übersetzung mit Einleitung und Kommentar von Atli Magnus Seelow, FAU University Press, Erlangen, 2018.
- Eugenio Lux (Ed.), Marco Biraghi (preword), Luca Ortelli (afterword), acceptera, LetteraVentidue, Siracusa, 2024.

== See also ==
- Toward an Architecture
- Form follows function
- Ornament and Crime
