= Sven Markelius =

Swedish architect

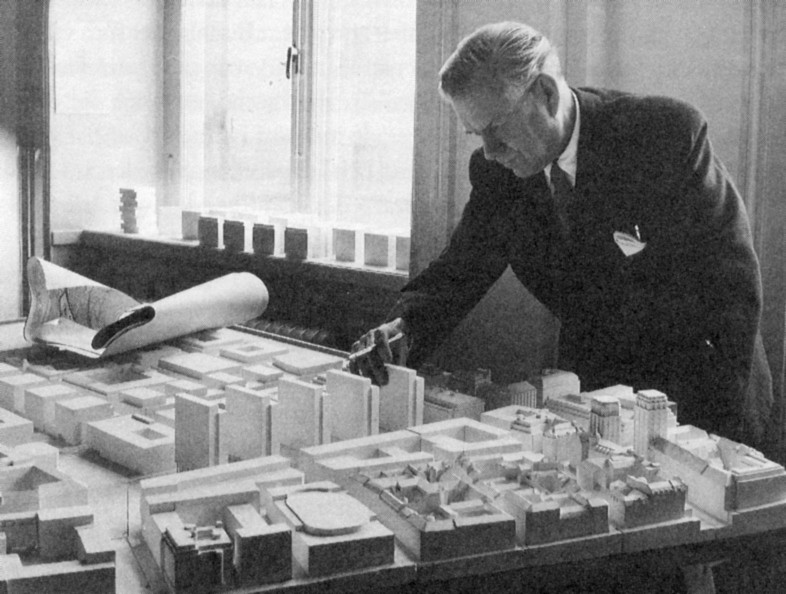
Sven Markelius, 1954, over a model of Norrmalm

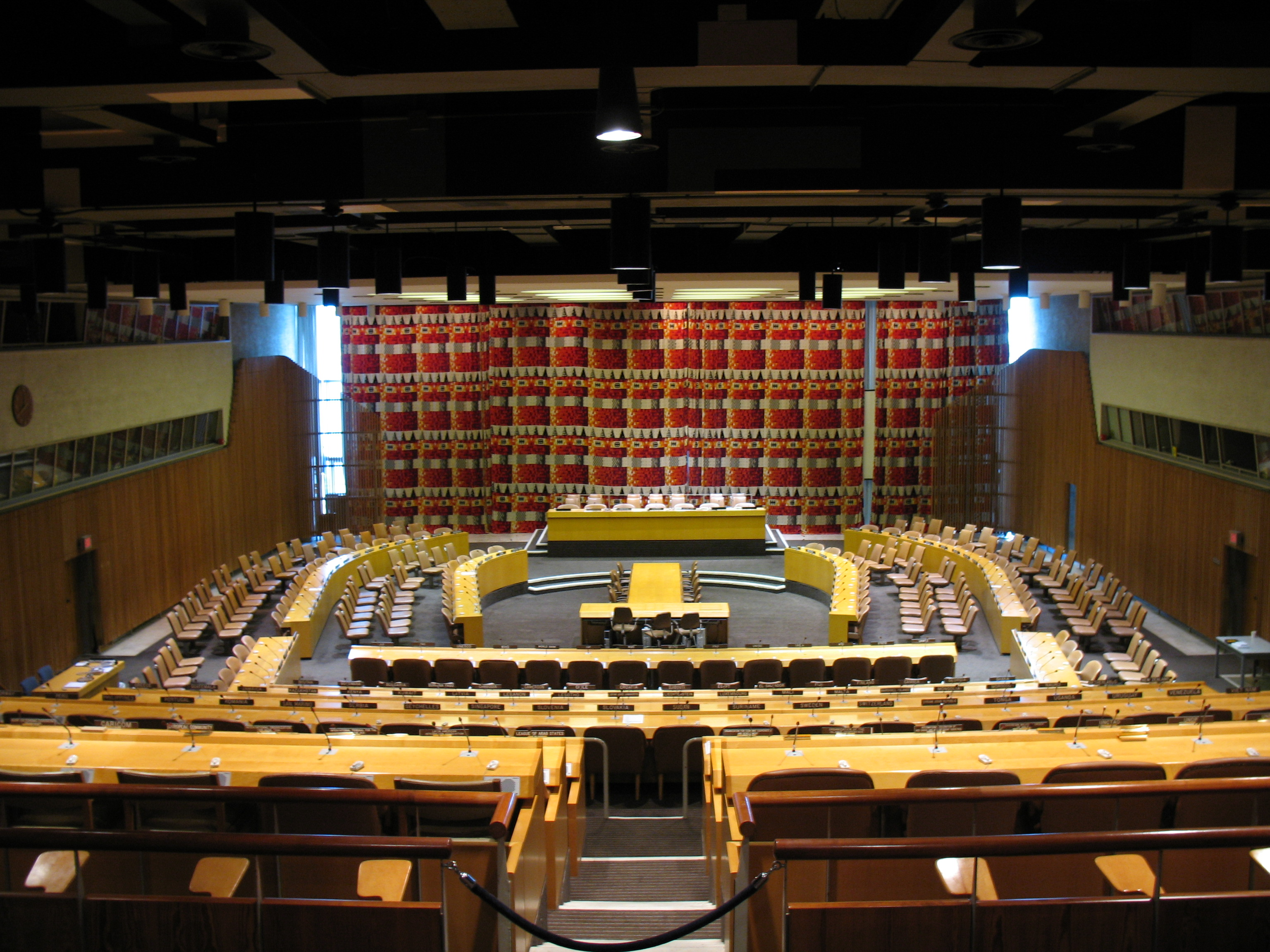
The United Nations Economic and Social Council, New York City

Sven Gottfrid Markelius (25 October 1889 – 24 February 1972) was a Swedish modernist architect. Markelius played an important role in the post-war urban planning of Stockholm, for example in the creation of the model suburbs of Vällingby (1950s) and Farsta (1960s).

== Biography ==
Born in Stockholm, he attended the Royal Institute of Technology and the Academy of Arts in Stockholm from 1910 to 1915, later working at the offices of Ragnar Östberg and Erik Lallerstedt. He developed an early interest in housing and planning, was one of the founder members of CIAM in 1928, and participated in the modernist housing section of the Stockholm International Exhibition (1930), the birth of Swedish Functionalism.

In 1931, he co-authored the book-length manifesto "acceptera", promoting modernism as a set of cultural values. His association with Swedish reformer Alva Myrdal (1902–1986) resulted in a design for a 57-unit communal-living Collective House in the center of Stockholm, in 1935. The building offered communal amenities like childcare facilities and shared kitchen and meeting spaces, all at least partly inspired by the Narkomfin Building in Moscow. Markelius lived in the Collective House himself for thirty years, serving as an unofficial handyman, to make sure the building still worked, and to demonstrate his commitment to the values of social housing.

Meanwhile, among his major civic projects, Markelius began work on the Concert Hall in Helsingborg in 1932. In 1952, Markelius was nominated to the board of design consultants for the United Nations Secretariat Building by Sweden. Towards the end of his career the architect turned his attention to city planning.

In 1949 Markelius took the Howland Memorial Prize, and in 1961 the Prince Eugen Medal. In 1962 Markelius was awarded a Gold Medal by the Royal Institute of British Architects.

== Significant buildings ==
- 1931 - Student Union at the Royal Institute of Technology, Stockholm, with Uno Åhrén
- 1932 - Helsingborg Concert Hall (completed 1934)
- 1933 - Villa Markelius, his own home in Stockholm
- 1935 - Stockholm Collective House
- 1937 - Villa Myrdal
- 1939 - Swedish pavilion at the 1939 New York World's Fair
- 1945 and onward - city planning for the Redevelopment of Norrmalm, Stockholm
- 1952 - United Nations Economic and Social Council interior, at the United Nations Secretariat Building, a gift to the United Nations from Sweden
- 1953 - original city plan for Vällingby
- 1961-1966 - Sverigehuset Sweden House at Kungsträdgården
- 1962 - one of the five glass Hötorget buildings, Stockholm

== Images ==
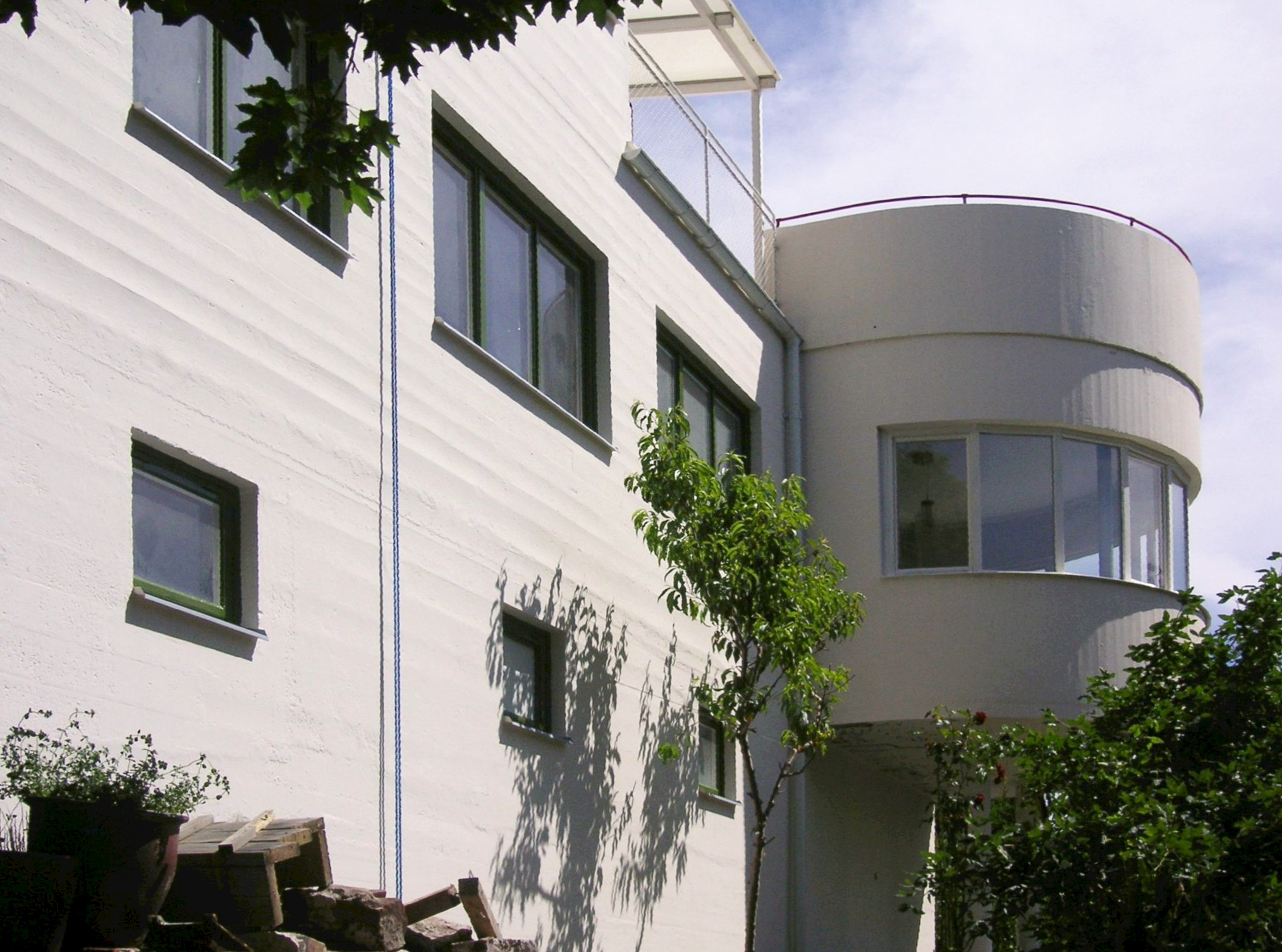
Villa Markelius 1933

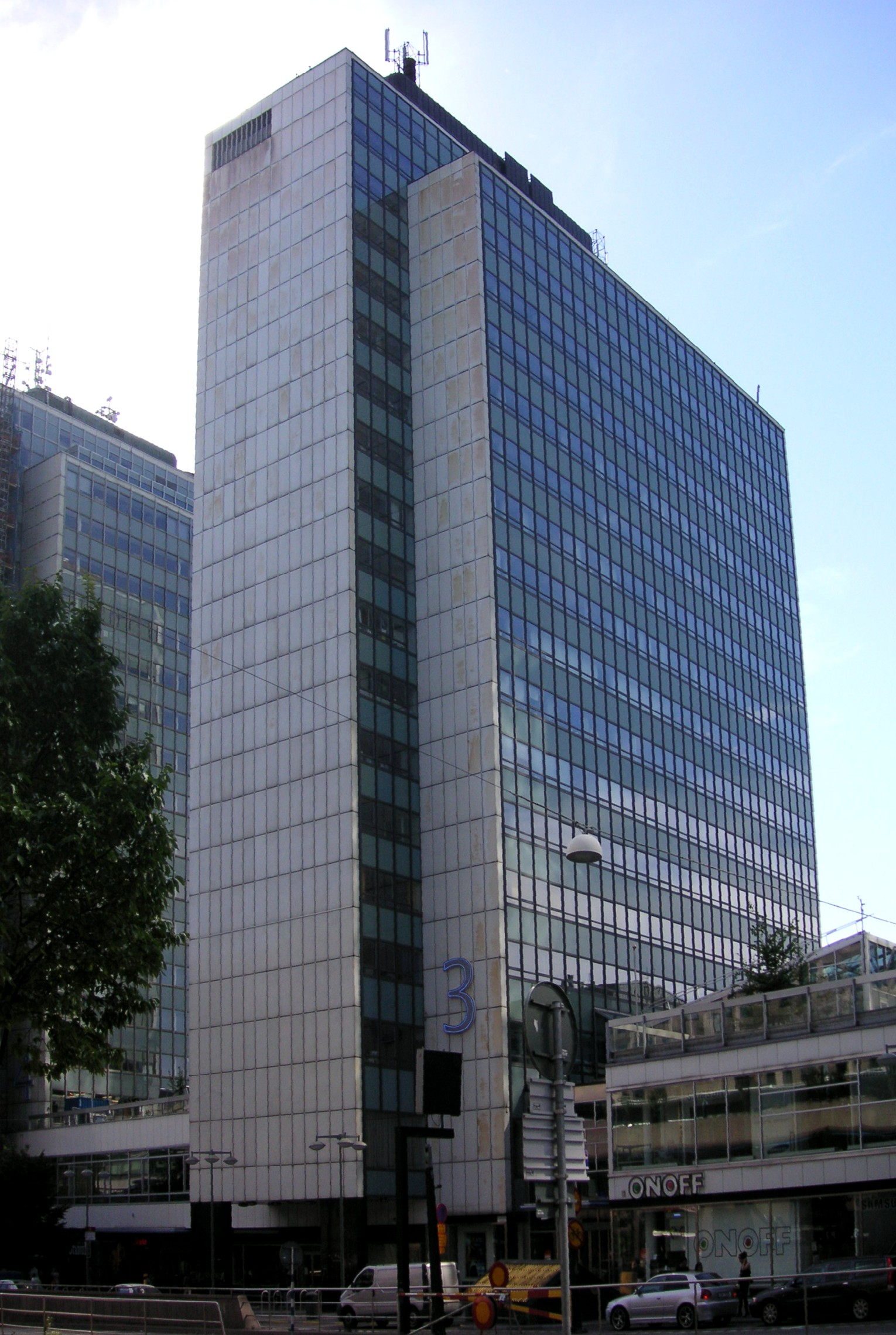
Hötorget #3

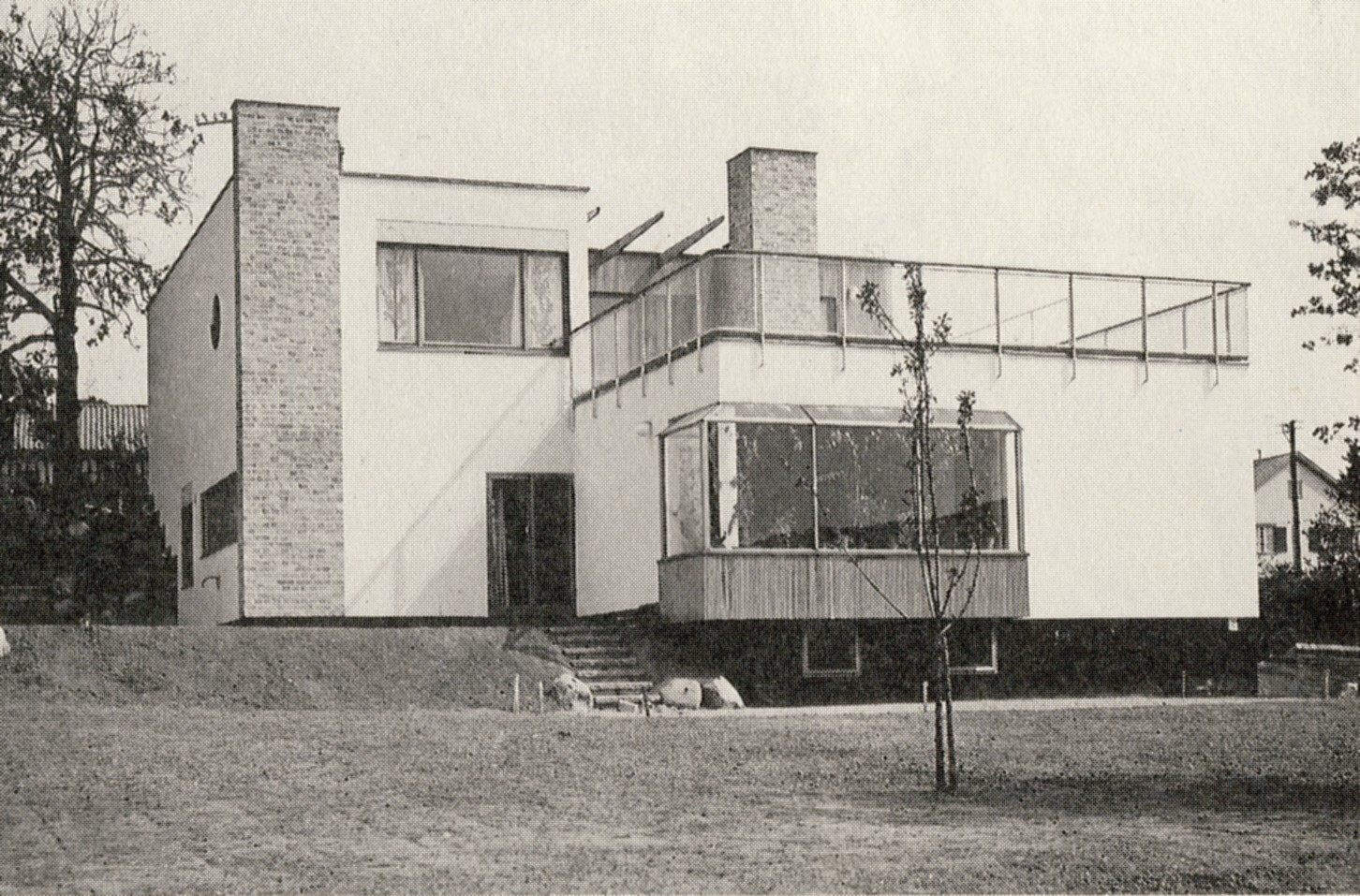
Villa Myrdal, 1937

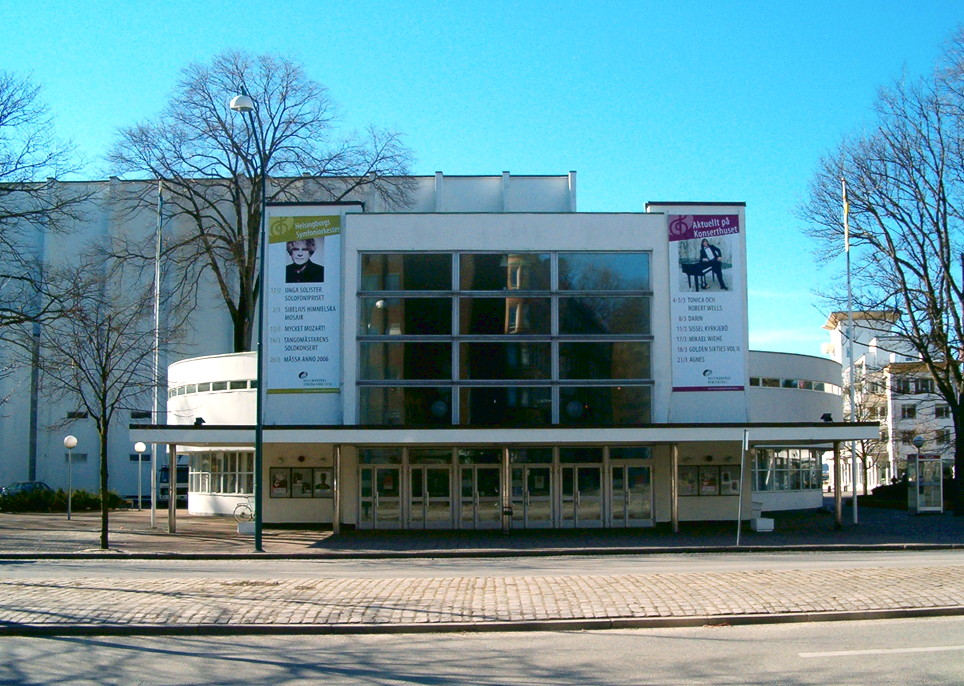
Helsingborg Concert House, 1932

== Other sources ==
- Eva Rudberg (1989) Sven Markelius, arkitekt (Arkitektur förlag) ISBN 978-9186050221
