= Ängbyplan metro station =

Stockholm Metro station

Ängbyplan
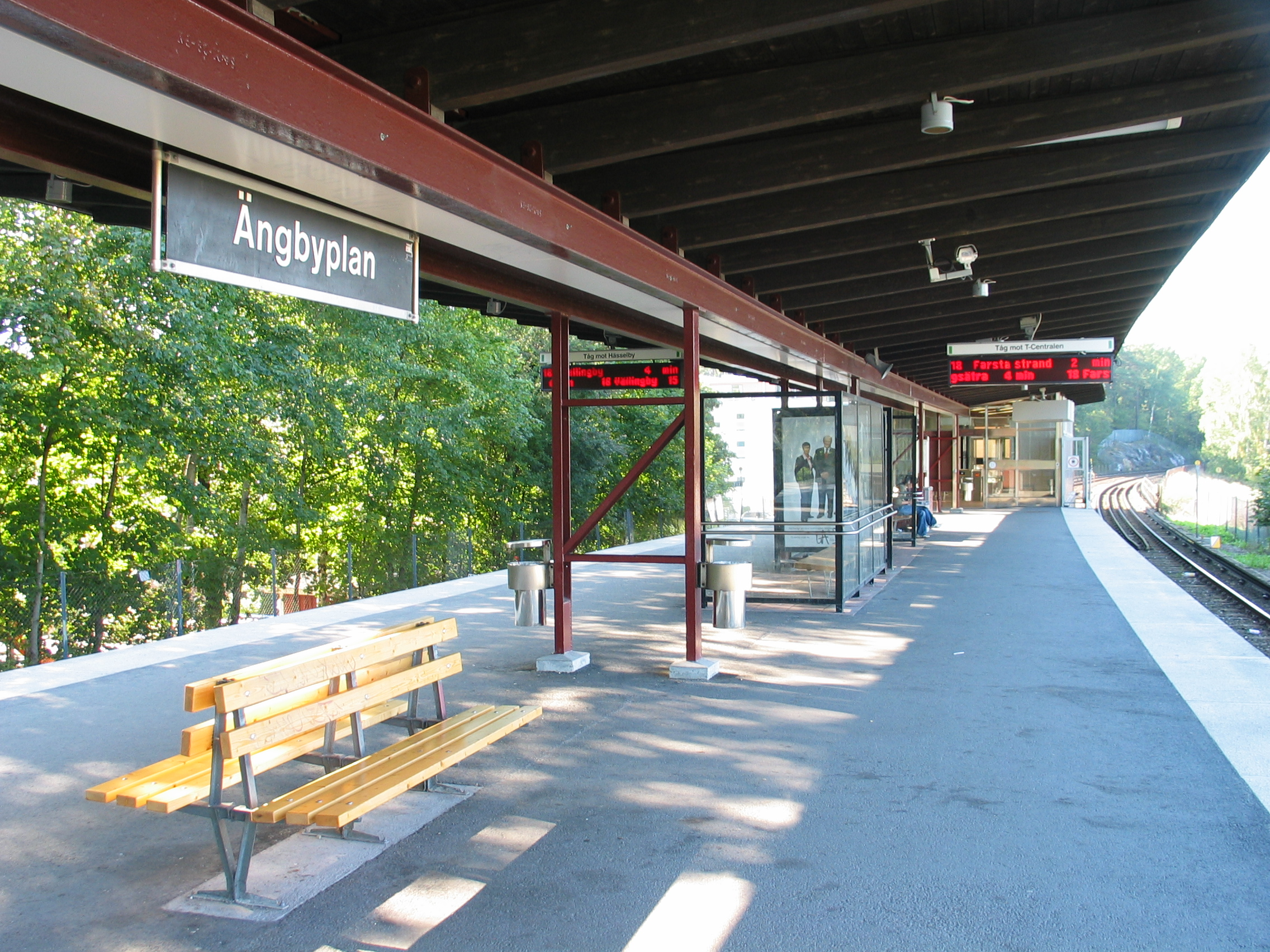
- Station platform, 2006

General information
- Coordinates: 59°20′30.8″N 17°54′26.6″E
- System: Stockholm Metro station
- Owner: Storstockholms Lokaltrafik
- Distance: 12.4 km (7.7 mi) from Slussen
- Platforms: 1 island platform
- Tracks: 2

Construction
- Structure type: At grade
- Accessible: Yes

Other information
- Station code: ÄBP

History
- Opened: 26 October 1952; 73 years ago

Passengers
- 2019: 1,650 boarding per weekday

Services
Preceding station	Stockholm Metro	Following station
Islandstorget towards Hässelby strand	Line 19	Åkeshov towards Hagsätra
Location
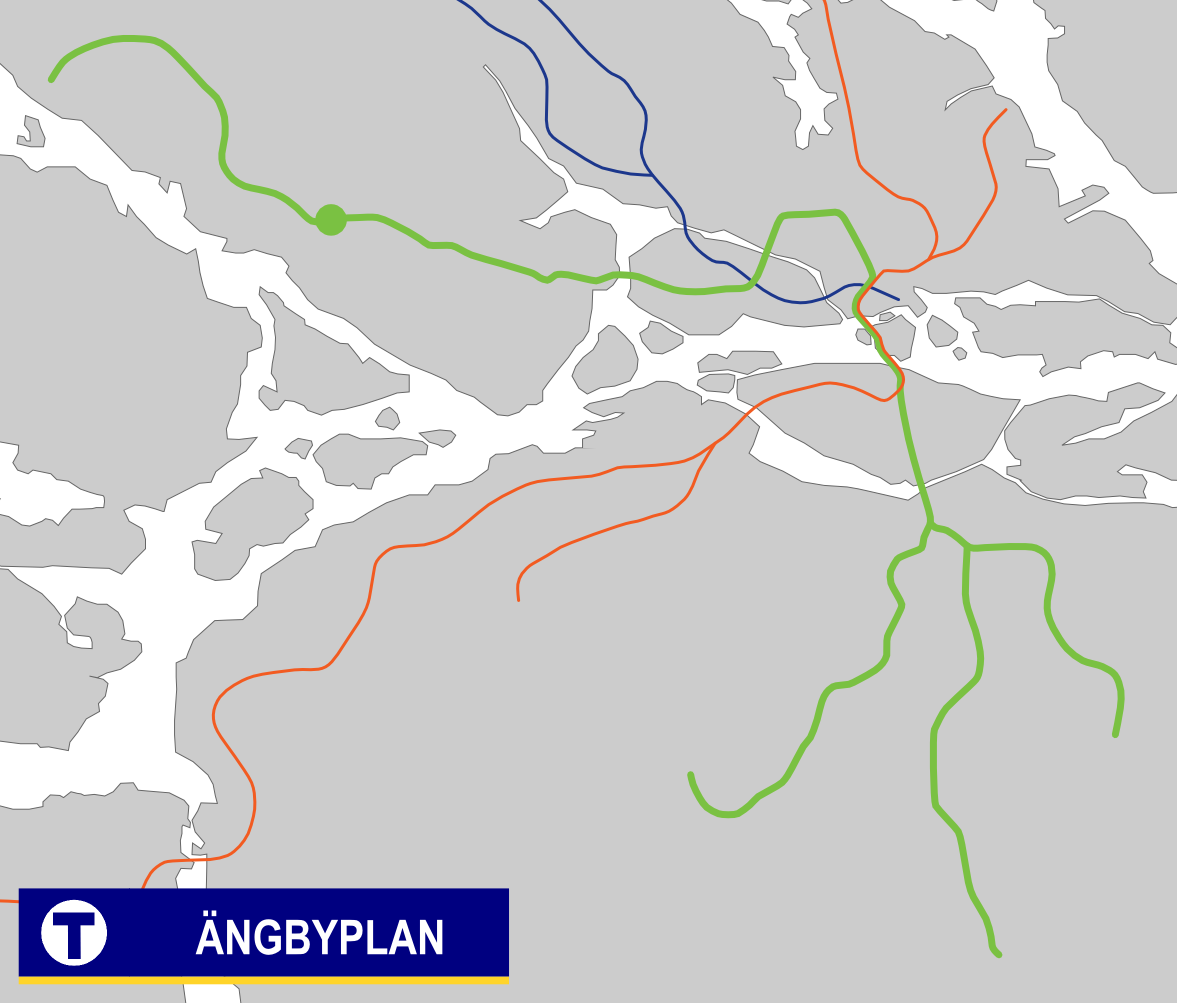

Ängbyplan metro station, formerly known as Färjestadsvägen metro station, is a station on the Green Line of the Stockholm Metro. It is located in the district of Södra Ängby, which is part of the borough of Bromma in the west of the city of Stockholm. The station is above ground and has a single island platform, with access from the underpass taking Färjestadsvägen under the line. The distance to Slussen is 12.4 kilometres (7.7 mi).

The station lies on the route of a line known as the Ängbybanan that formerly linked Alvik and Islandstorget. The Ängbybanan was designed and built for use by the future metro, but was operated from 1944 as part of line 11 of the Stockholm tramway. Ängbyplan station was inaugurated as part of the metro on 26 October 1952 with the conversion of the Ängbybanan and its extension to form the metro line between Hötorget and Vällingby. It was called Färjestadsvägen until 1962.

The metro station was decorated with tile in 1994 by Åsa Lindström.

== Gallery ==
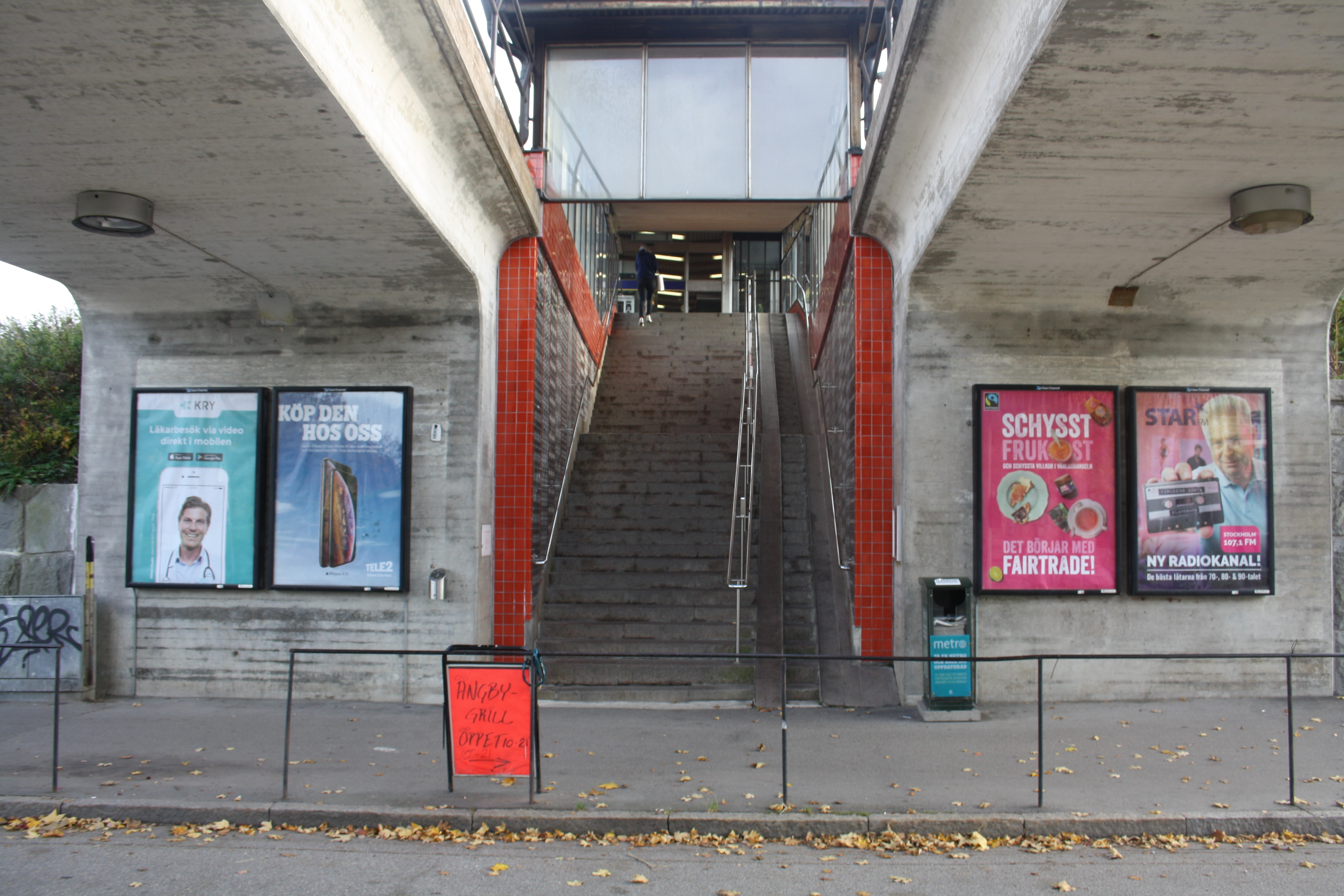
Station entrance, 2018

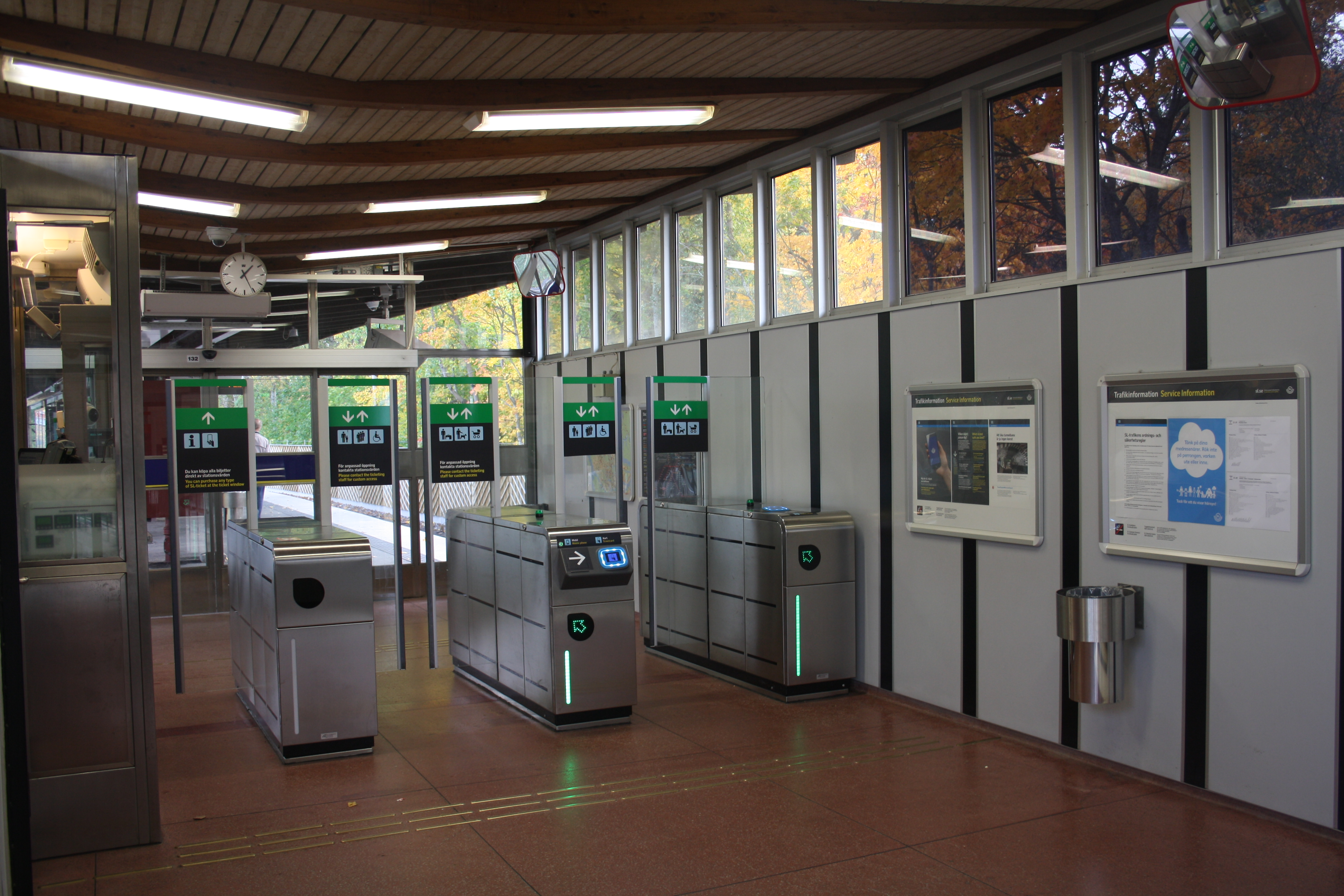
Ticket hall, 2018

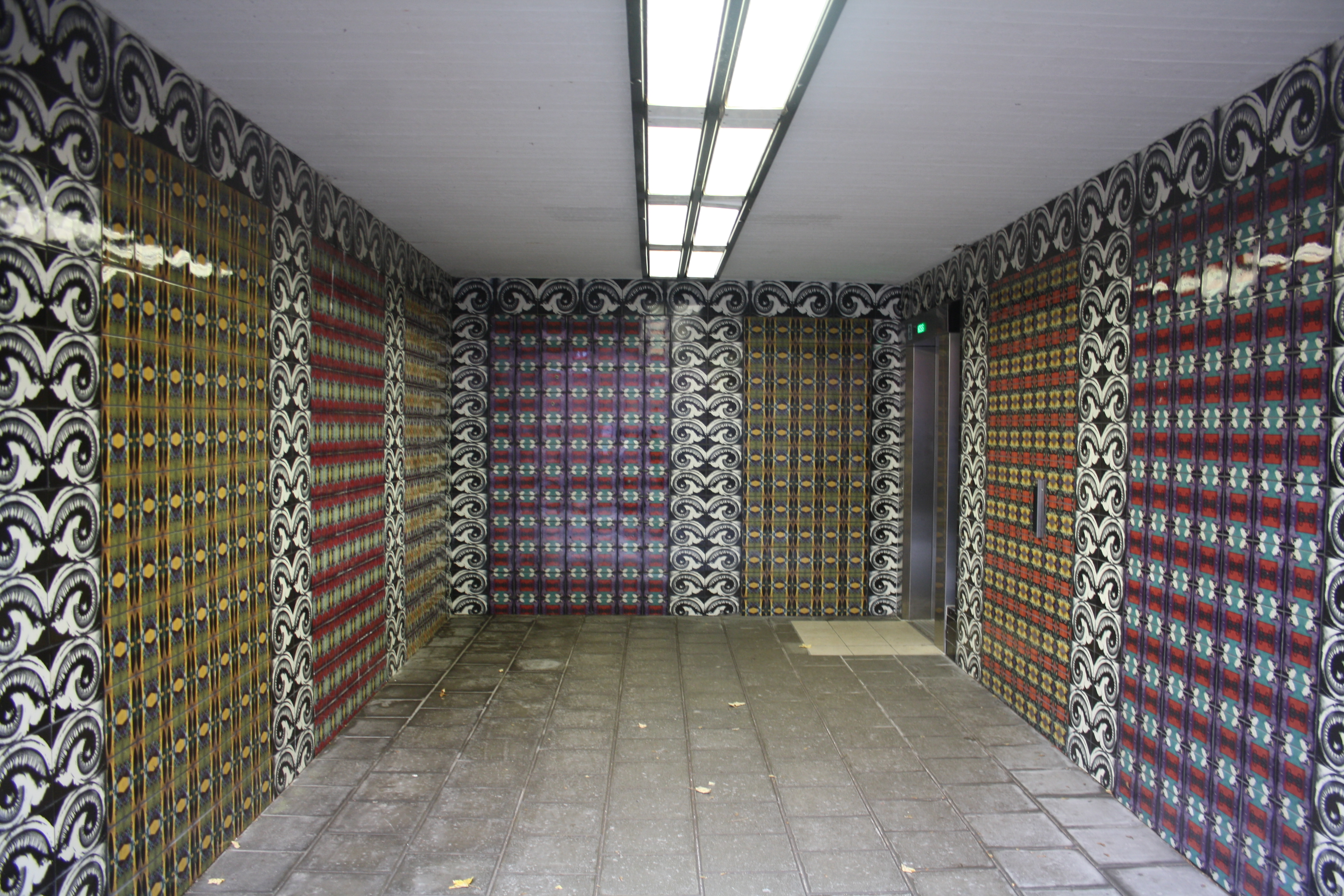
Tiled artwork, 2018
