= Arenander =

Arenander is a Nordic surname. Notable people with the surname include:

- Britt Arenander (born 1941), Swedish translator, writer, and journalist
- Gudrun Arenander (1921–2020), Swedish discus thrower
- Nick Ekelund-Arenander (born 1989), Danish/Swedish sprinter
