= Britt Arenander =

Swedish author and translator (1941–2022)

- Born: 30 September 1941; Stockholm
- Died: 15 July 2022 (aged 80); Spain
- Occupation: journalist
- Writing career
- Notable work: novel

Britt Arenander (30 September 1941 – 15 July 2022) was a Swedish translator, writer and journalist.

== Life ==
She was born in Stockholm and was educated at Södra Flickläroverket. She trained as a journalist during the 1960s. Arenander published a series of novels Steget in 1968, Off in 1969 and Alla broar brända in 1971. In 1974, she published her first collection of poetry Dröm om verkligheten utanför Stockholm och andra dikter. She has also written radio plays. During the 1990s, she worked as a translator of French and English literature into Swedish, including much of Anaïs Nin's diaries. She has also contributed to various anthologies including Liv och kärlek: om kvinnor av kvinnor and Anais Nin: A Book of Mirrors.

She served as press officer for the Secretariat of the Swedish branch of Amnesty International. She was also international secretary for the Swedish PEN club.

Arenander married Gustav Wiklund in 1964. The couple separated in 1973.

== Selected works ==
- Affären som inte fanns Stockholm: Alba, 1982, ISBN 9789174585100, OCLC 872585700
- Lorenzas dagbok Stockholm: Alba, 1990, ISBN 9789174581393, OCLC 35287363
- Anaïs Nins förlorede värld Stockholm: Trevi, 1995, ISBN 9789171611260, OCLC 186052489
  - Anaïs Nin's Lost World Gaithersburg, MD : Sky Blue Press, 2017, ISBN 9780998724645, OCLC 1001807490
