= Helge Zimdal =

Swedish architect

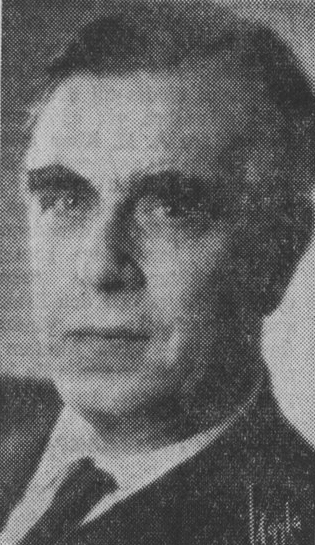
Helge Zimdal

Helge Zimdal, originally Zimdahl ( April 27, 1903 in Alingsås − October 3, 2001 in Hovås in Gothenburg) was a Swedish architect and professor of architecture at Chalmers University of Technology, known for his many school buildings.

== Biography ==
Helge Zimdal grew up in Alingsås, where his father Elis Zimdahl was mayor. Mother Nancy Beck was Danish by birth. In connection with Zimdal becoming a professor at Chalmers in 1951, he removed the h from his surname. Zimdal graduated from the school of architecture at the Royal Institute of Technology in Stockholm in 1927 and from the Academy of Fine Arts in Stockholm in 1930. He participated in the Stockholm exhibition in 1930 with furniture and textiles, the furniture partly in collaboration with Carl-Axel Acking. At KTH he had met Nils Ahrbom with whom he ran the architectural office Ahrbom & Zimdahl together in the years 1927–1951.

Ahrbom & Zimdahl designed a large number of schools in Stockholm, for example Sveaplan's girls' education institute (Sveaplan's high school) in 1936 and Södra flickläroverket at Skanstull (Skanstull's high school) in 1943, as well as in the rest of the country such as in Ludvika, Sara, Motala and Enköping. In 1951, the collaboration ended when Helge Zimdal became professor of architecture at Chalmers in Gothenburg (1951–1970). Ahrbom was a professor at KTH in the years 1942–1963.

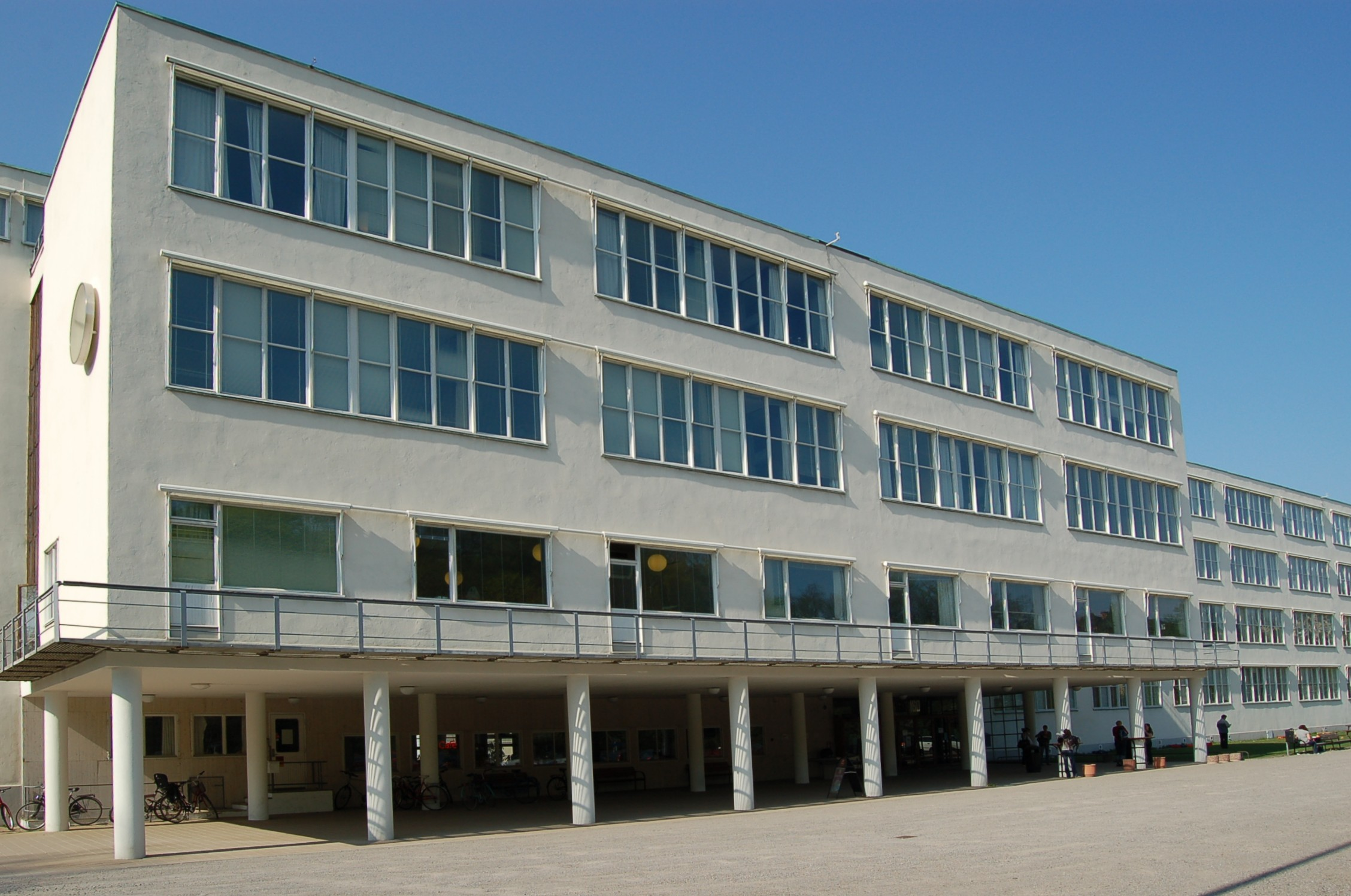
The girls' schools at Sveaplan in Stockholm, 1936, now the University of Social Sciences at Stockholm University

Zimdal was diligent as a publicist in the trade and daily press, where he often set the tone. He wanted a critical and constructive debate about architecture and was outraged when architecture became "cold-hammered, callous, inhuman and degenerated into grandiosity, gigantomania and the rape of nature". He often traveled to Greece and Italy, preferably with his family, but also with colleagues, clients and politicians. The personal contacts were as important a prerequisite as the problem solving itself, he said.

In 1988, Zimdal received the Chalmers Medal[6], which is awarded to the person who, through interest and valuable contribution, has promoted the university's operations and development.

In 2011, Zimdal had a footpath from Sven Hultins Gata to Kolonigatan in the Landala Egnahem area of Gothenburg named after him, Helge Zimdals Gångväg.

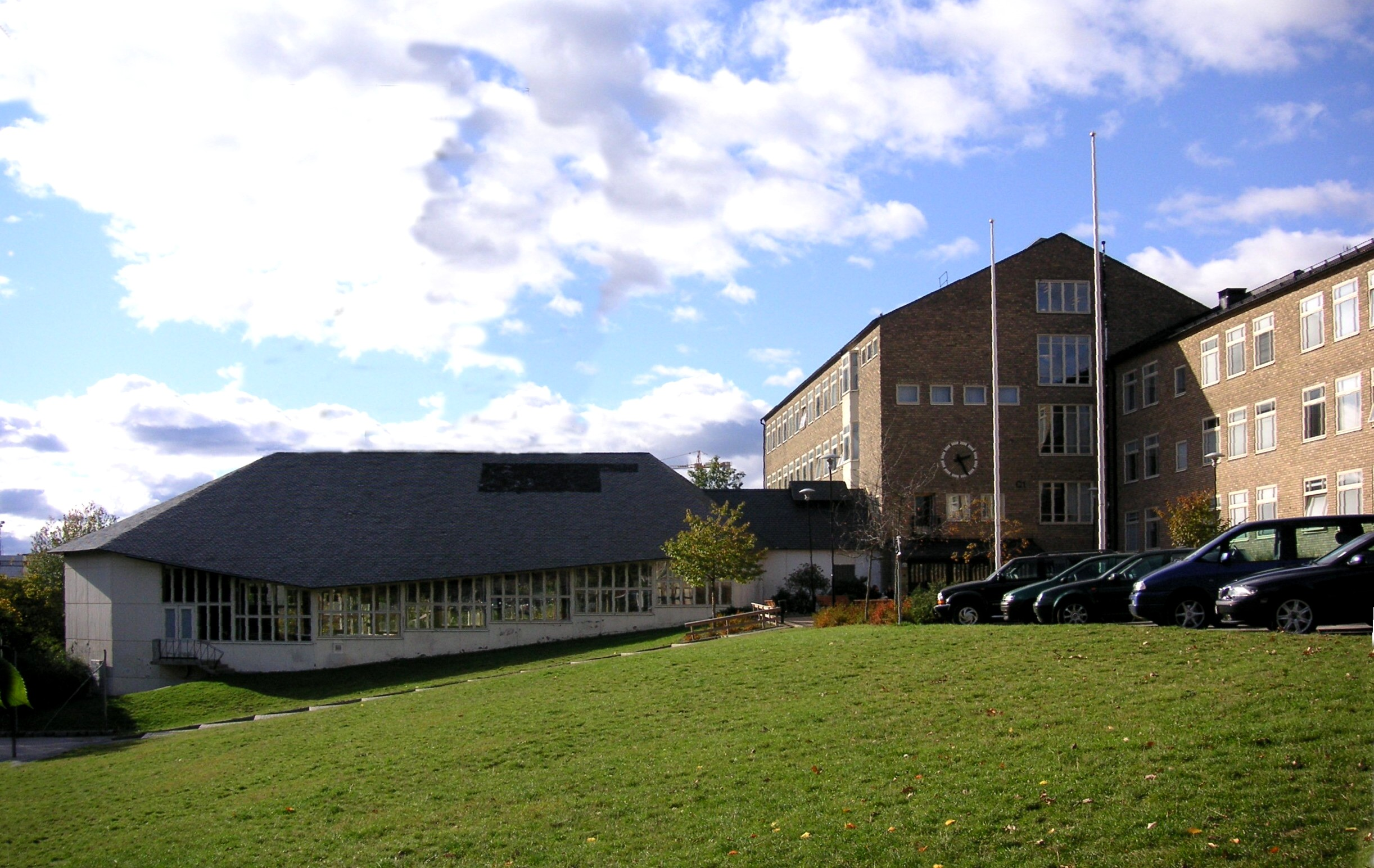
Södermalm's higher general curriculum for girls in Stockholm

Helge Zimdal was an honorary architect in Sweden's National Association of Architects (SAR).[8] He became a knight of the Vasa Order in 1949.

== Construction works in selection ==
- 1936–39 Östergötland county museum, Linköping
- 1936 Sveaplan's high school, Stockholm
- 1937–38 Eriksdal School, Stockholm
- 1937–38 Älvsjöbadet, Hagsätra, Stockholm
- 1945 Södermalm's higher general curriculum for girls (Skanstull's high school), Stockholm
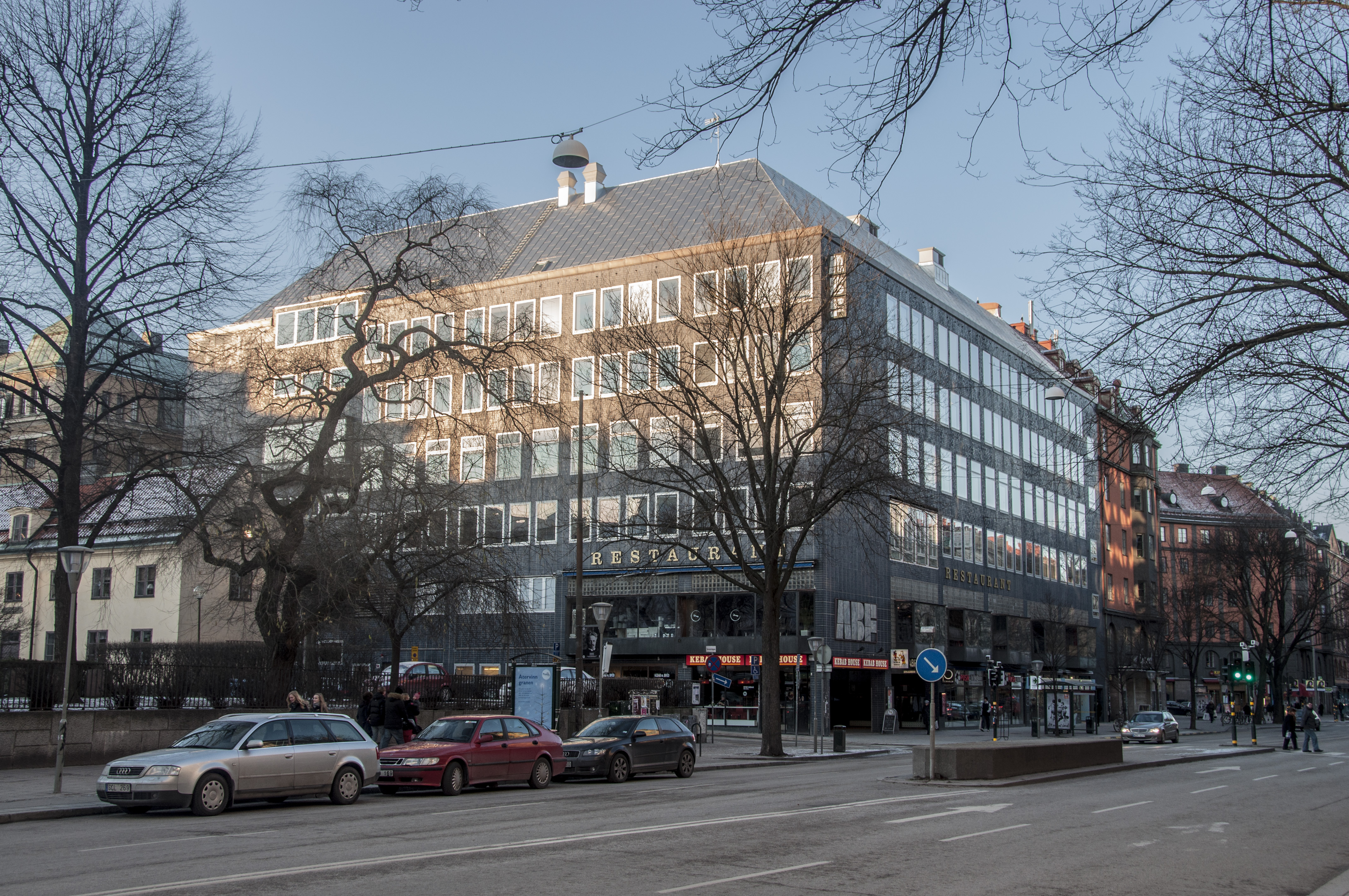
- The ABF building in Stockholm
  1946–48 Gubbängens folk school, Stockholm
- 1953 Office for AB Flygmotor, Trollhättan
- 1956–57 Yxhultsbolaget headquarters, Hällabrottet
- 1958 Blidvädersgatan, Södra Biskopsgåden, Gothenburg
- 1958-60 Kungsportsavenyen 21–23, Gothenburg
- 1960 Kungsportsavenyen 34/Engelbrektsgatan 33/Lorensbergsgatan 19, Gothenburg
- 1961 ABF building, Stockholm
- 1966 Guldhed church, Gothenburg
- 1968 School of Architecture at Chalmers, Gothenburg
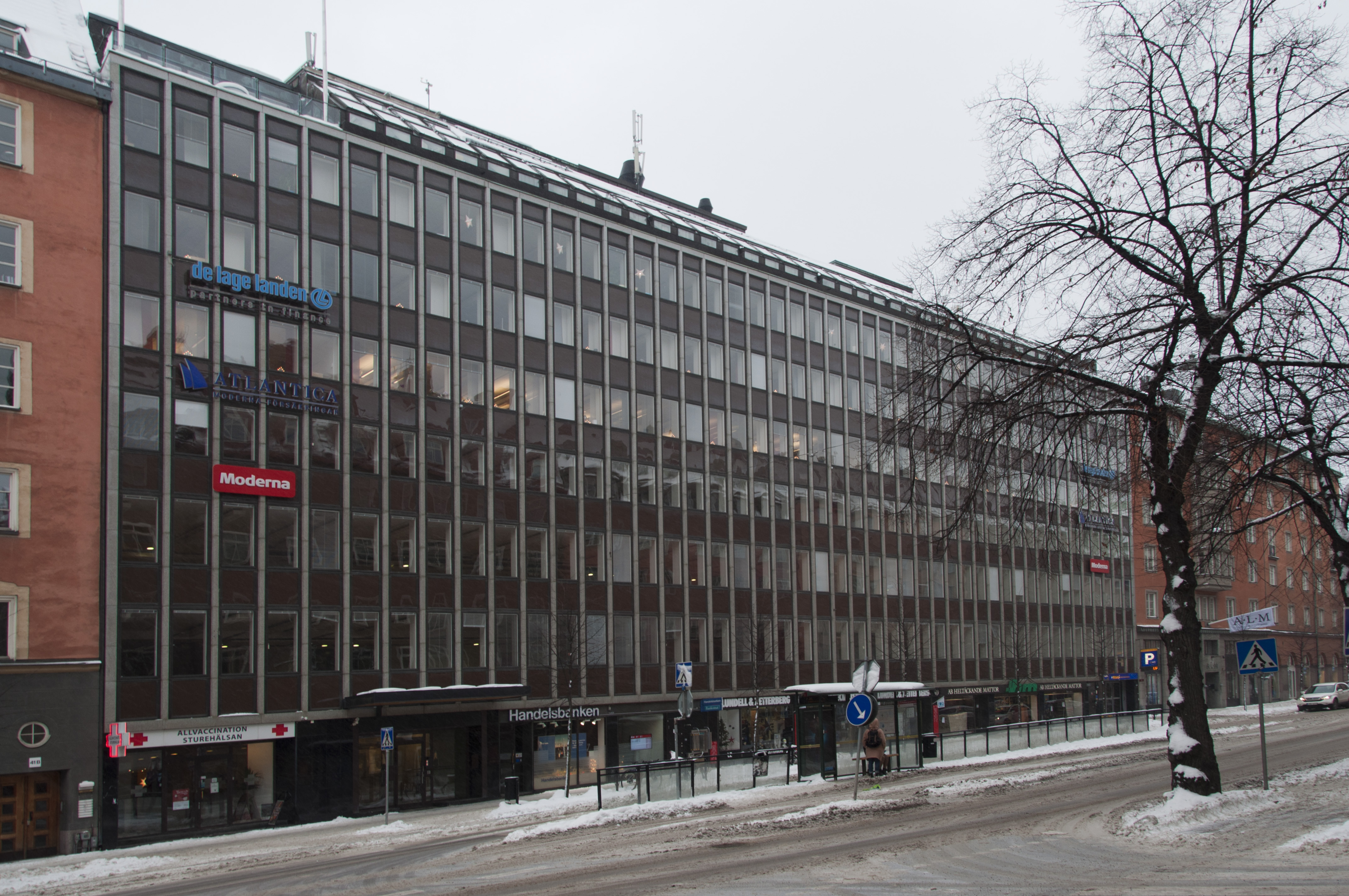
  Försäkrings AB Valand on Birger Jarlsgatan in Stockholm, 1960
- 1968 Sjövalla Klint 10, villa by Stensjön, Mölndal
- 1974 Swedish Embassy in Brasília

== Bibliography ==
- Zimdal, Helge (1981). En arkitekt minns. Göteborg: Sektionen för arkitektur, Chalmers tekn. högsk. (CTH). Libris 7593345. ISBN 978-91-7032-030-9
- Svensk Arkitektur 1986:1, Byggförlaget, Stockholm 1986
- Småstad vid sekelskiftet: Alingsås-minnen, Alingsås, Michelsen, 1987
- Helge Zimdal i Libris
