= Stockholm Exhibition (1930) =

Art exhibition in Stockholm, Sweden

Coordinates: 59°19′57″N 18°06′57″E

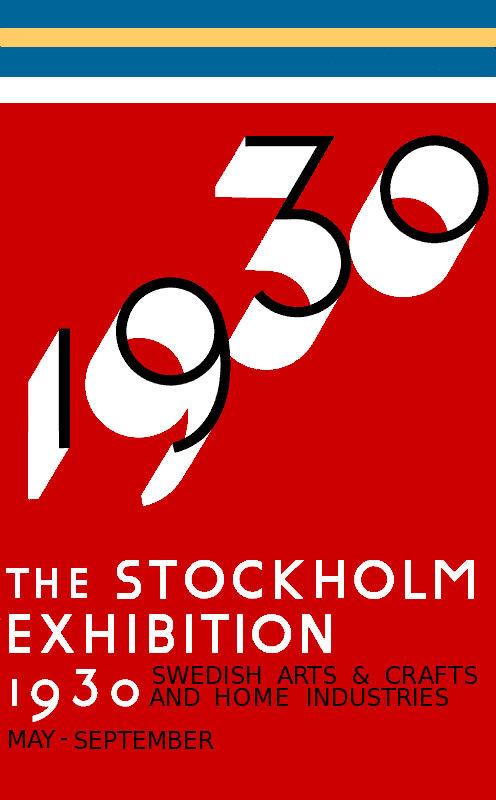
Poster for the 1930 Stockholm Fair

The Stockholm Exhibition (in Swedish, Stockholmsutställningen) was an exhibition held in 1930 in Stockholm, Sweden, which had a great impact on the architectural styles known as Functionalism and the International style.

The fair was conducted by the City of Stockholm and the Svenska Slöjdföreningen (which has evolved into the existing organization, Swedish Form) art society. The art historian and leader of the Svenska Slöjdföreningen, Gregor Paulsson, was the intellectual leader of the fair, inspired, after a visit to the 1927 Weissenhof Estate in Stuttgart, to organize a similar event for Stockholm.

It took place from May through September 1930, on the southern portion of the Djurgården recreation area in eastern-central Stockholm, and entertained about four million visitors.

Swedish artists, craftsmen and companies showed their latest products, particularly the glass producer Orrefors Glasbruk. Many of the available images were taken by the pioneering color photographer Gustaf Wernersson Cronquist using the Autochrome Lumière process, and were published by Swedish Form.

The exhibition's slogan was: Acceptera!, or Accept!, literally a plea for acceptance of functionalism, standardization, and mass production as a cultural change. The effort to persuade Swedish citizens of the benefits of a modernized lifestyle included serving mass-produced food.

== Architecture ==
The fair was significant in the history of architecture in Stockholm, firmly establishing functionalism as the dominant architectural style in Sweden.

The two head architects were Gunnar Asplund and Sigurd Lewerentz. Through the 1920s Asplund had been one of the principal figures of the Neo-Classicist Swedish Grace style. But here, in 1930, Asplund's style takes a dramatic turn into stripped-down functionalism. Especially conspicuous was the Paradise Cafe and the Entry Pavilion, with its exposed steel frame, airy expanses of glass, and dramatic lighting at night. Above the fair, a towering advertising mast stood with an electrically lit version of Lewerentz's "Flying V" logo.

Le Corbusier had been invited to contribute to the fair, but declined.

The fair also showcased new housing alternatives, bright and hygienic apartments with ample space for all members of the family. Swedish architects involved in the Housing Exhibition included Sven Markelius, Paul Hedqvist, Nils Ahrbom, Helge Zimdal, and Uno Åhrén. Some critics found the architecture too crisp and cold to consider living with permanently. Three of the fair's architects were, in the following year, co-authors of the Acceptera! functionalist manifesto.

Alvar Aalto, describing the exhibition for the Finnish press, wrote, "The exhibition speaks out for joyful and spontaneous everyday life. And consistently propagates a healthy and unpretentious lifestyle based on economic realities."

== Impact ==
All of the fair buildings were temporary. But the fair's ideas lived on and influenced the shape of Swedish housing for years to come.

As early as 1931, one of the exhibition architects, Uno Åhrén, won the commission of the terraced settlement in North Ängby in Bromma, and in the outskirts of Stockholm, Traneberg (1937–38) and Hammarbyhöjden (1938), all apartments for large families. All houses had central heating; all apartments had a private bath / toilet and running hot and cold water, a fully equipped kitchen and a balcony. Large windows let light and air into the flats, the stairwell, there was even a rubbish chute, an adjoining greenspace, and a playground.

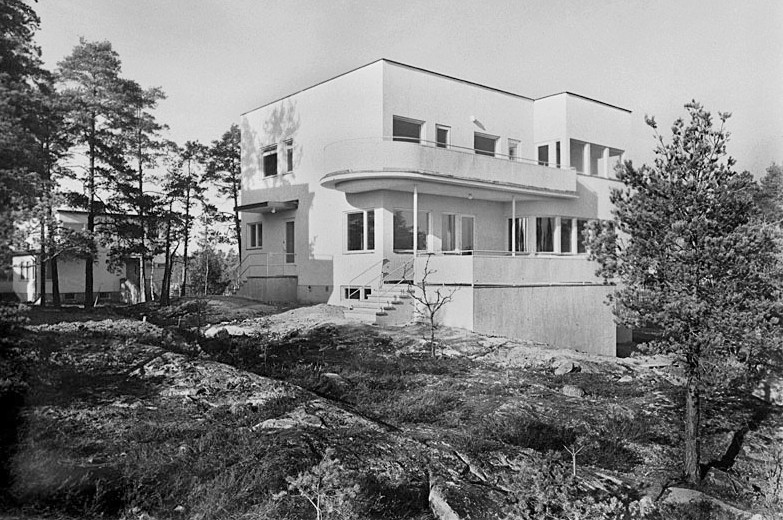
Villa Ängbyhöjden No.30, Södra Ängby, constructed 1938

The largest and finest-preserved collection of early functionalist housing is the residential settlement Södra Ängby, Bromma. Södra Ängby consists of about 500 single-family homes during the years 1933 to 1939, all in the functionalist style. One of the earliest examples was the house architect Sven Markelius built for himself at Nockeby 1930–31.

These housing districts were directly influenced by the 1930 fair, were designed by the same architects, and were built around cooperative Social Democratic values. Social housing was, in turn, a significant element in the development of the Swedish idea of Folkhemmet.

Åhrén was to collaborate with the sociologist, reformer and Nobel Prize winner Gunnar Myrdal from 1932 through 1935 on a social housing commission, and in 1934 they co-authored The Housing Question as a Social Planning Problem, a work that would prove influential in the structuring of the Social Democratic Swedish society. Markelius and the Swedish reformer Alva Myrdal collaborated on a design for a 57-unit communal-living Collective House in the center of Stockholm, in 1935, and Prime Minister Per Albin Hansson, who coined the word Folkhemmet, himself moved into an Åhrén-designed functionalist house in 1936.

== Images ==
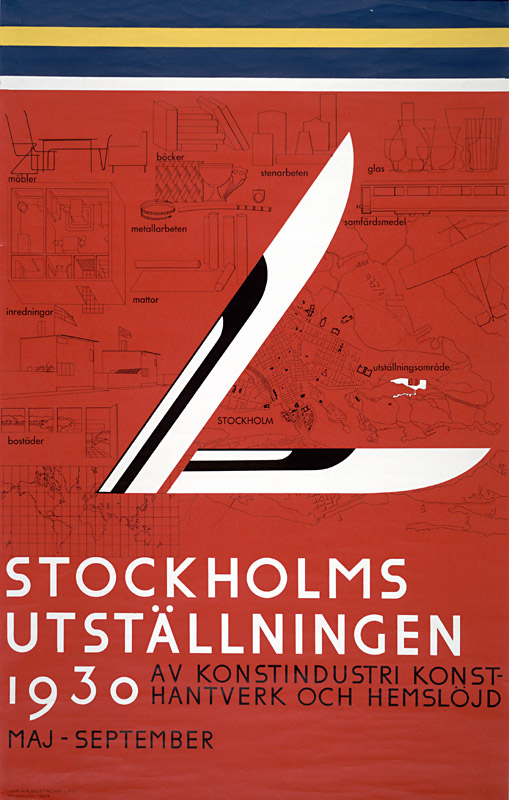
Poster with Lewerentz's "Winged V" emblem

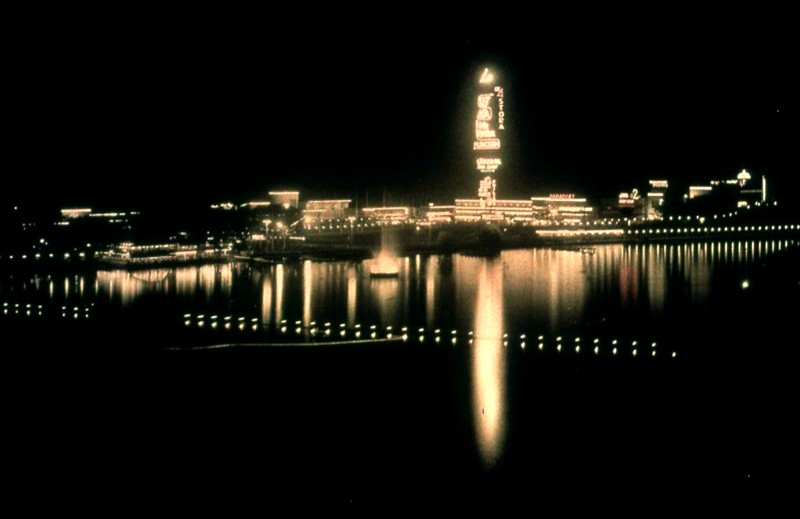
Night view, lakeside

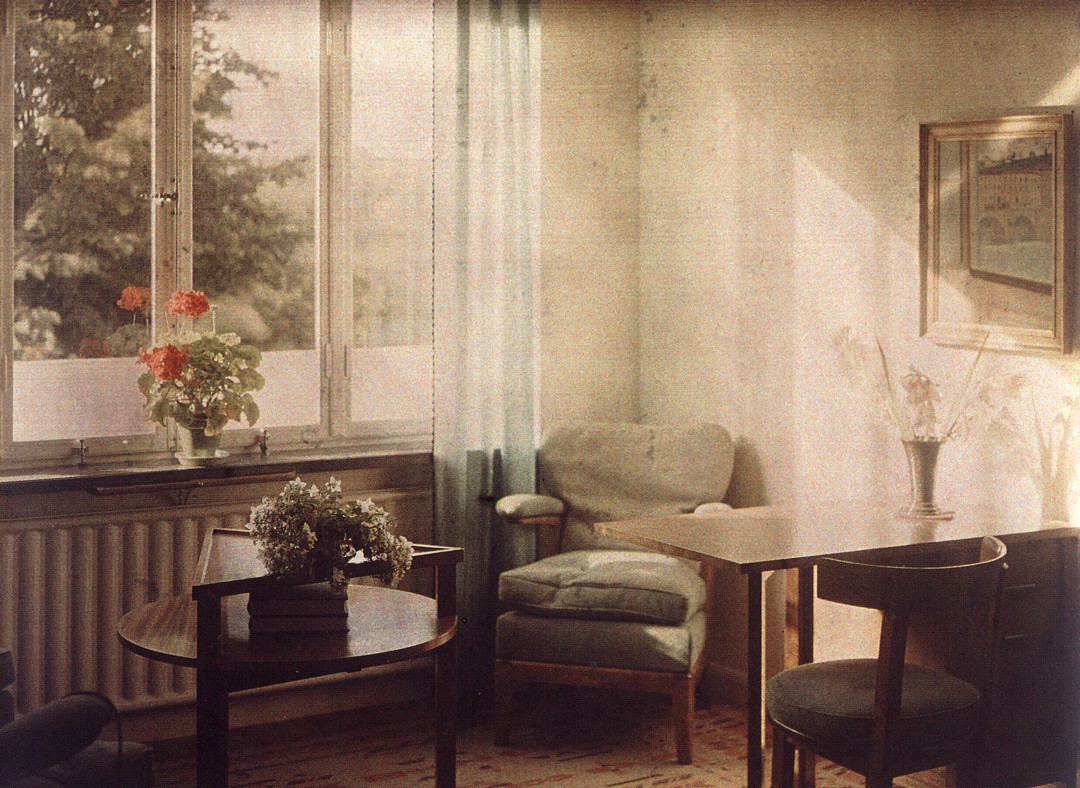
Functionalist interior space, type 4 dwelling

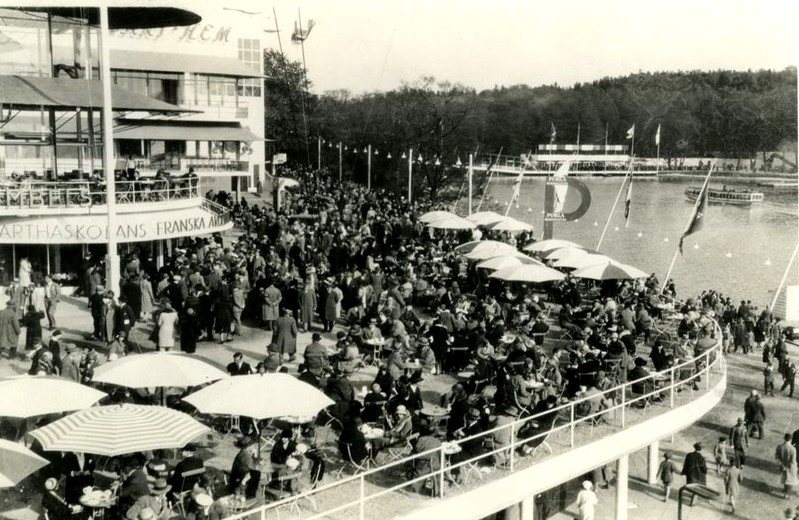
Restaurant crowd

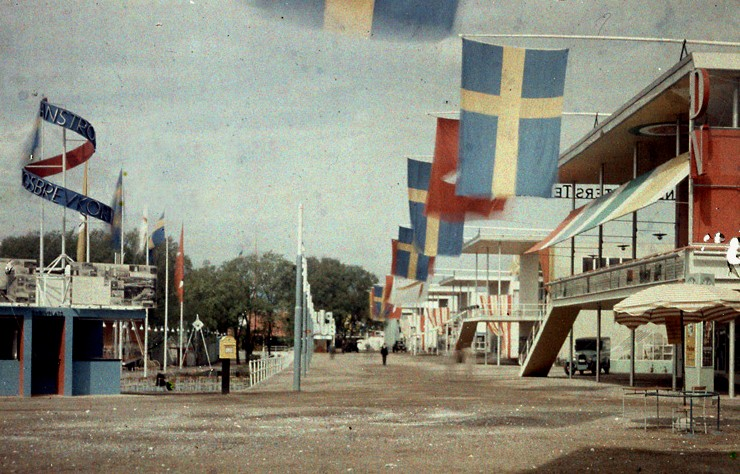
Photo by Gustaf Cronquist

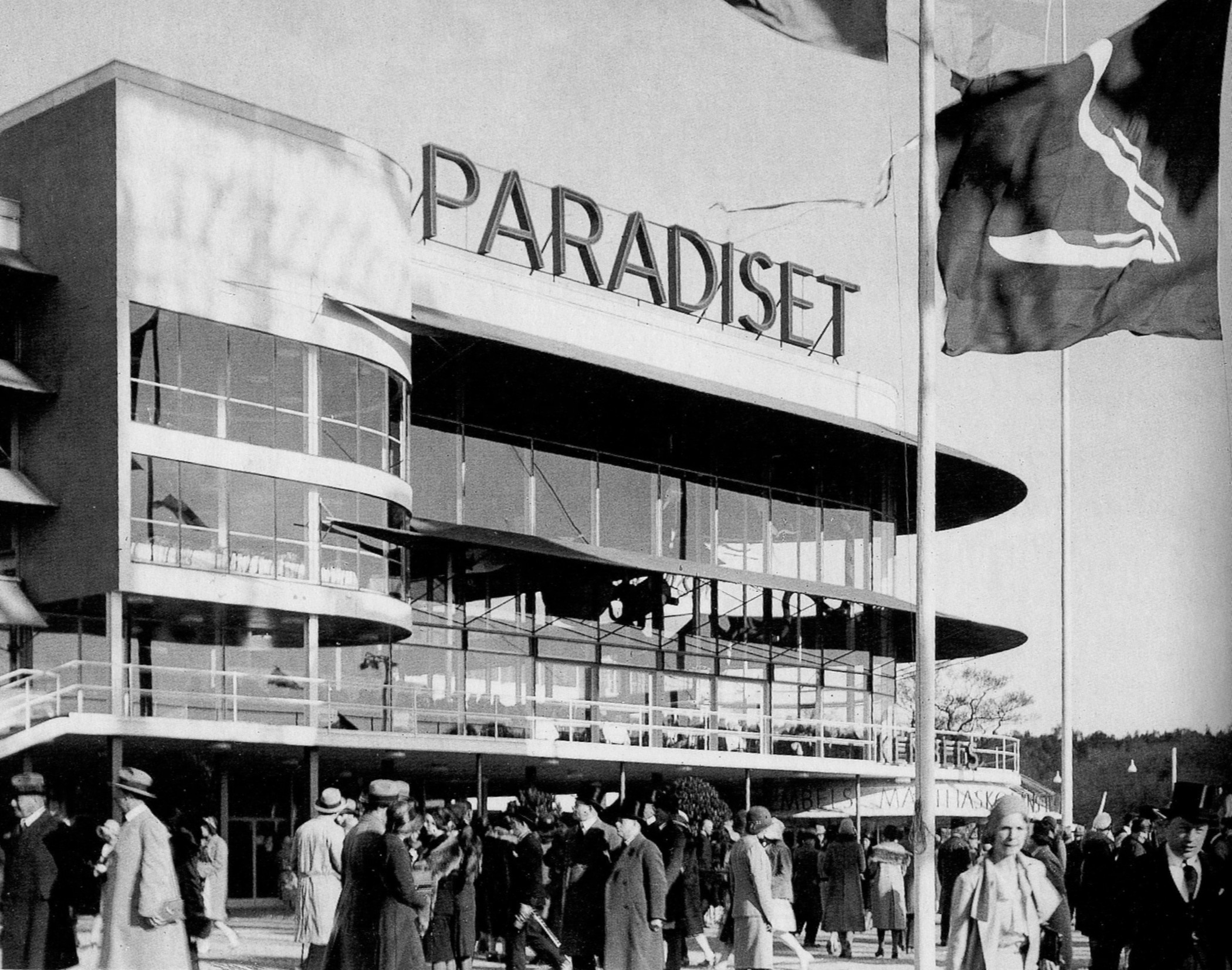
Another view of the Paradise Restaurant

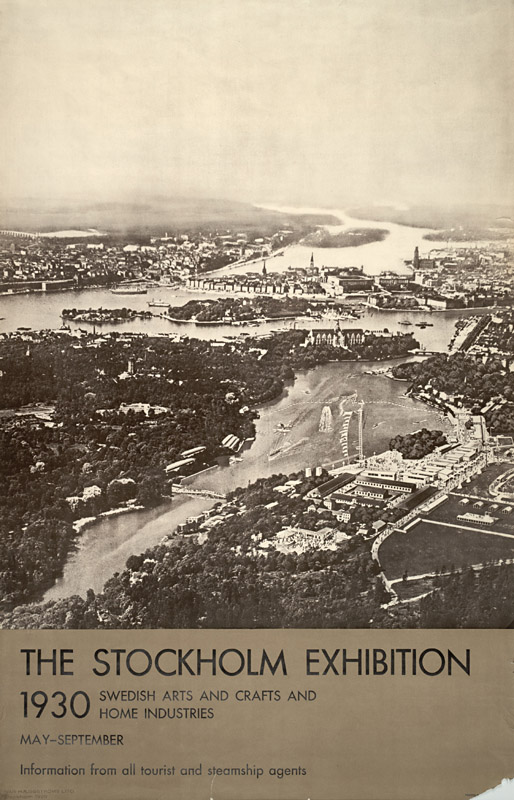
Poster in English

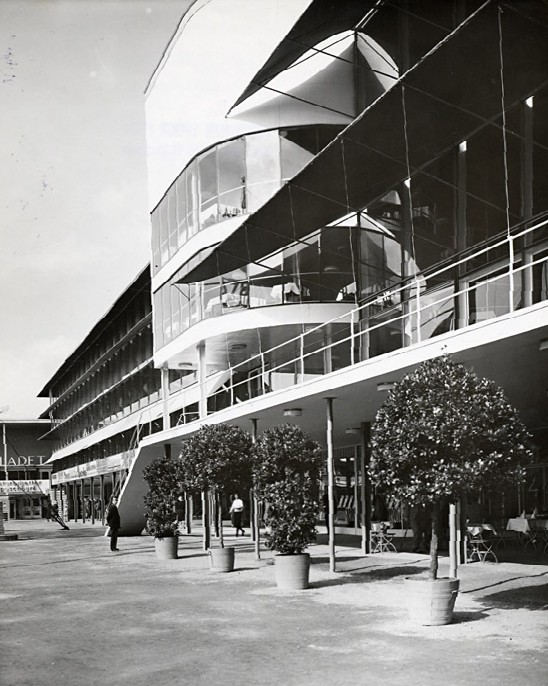
View of the Paradise Restaurant
