= Nils Ahrbom =

Swedish architect (1905–1997)

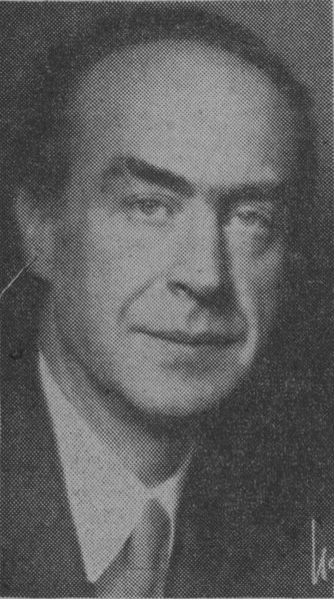

Nils Olof Ahrbom (May 24, 1905, in Hudiksvall − January 9, 1997, in Stockholm) was a Swedish architect, known for a large number of school buildings in Sweden.

== Biography ==
Nils Ahrbom was educated in 1927 at the KTH Royal Institute of Technology in Stockholm, where he was a classmate of Helge Zimdal. After graduating, he worked for five years with Ivar Tengbom, where he was an important employee at the creation of Esseltehuset in Stockholm (1934).

Ahrbom ran an architectural office together with Helge Zimdal in the years 1927–1950 under the name Ahrbom & Zimdahl. In 1931, they had won the competition for the girls' Pedagogy work at Sveaplan in Stockholm (now the University of Social Sciences). The initially markedly functionalist school building was given a slightly softer architecture during the course of the project, with inspiration from Denmark.

== Works ==
In 1930, Nils Ahrbom participated in the housing section of the Stockholm exhibition together with Uno Åhrén, Sven Markelius, Sigurd Lewerentz and Paul Hedqvist, among others, where they showed the new functionalist housing ideals.

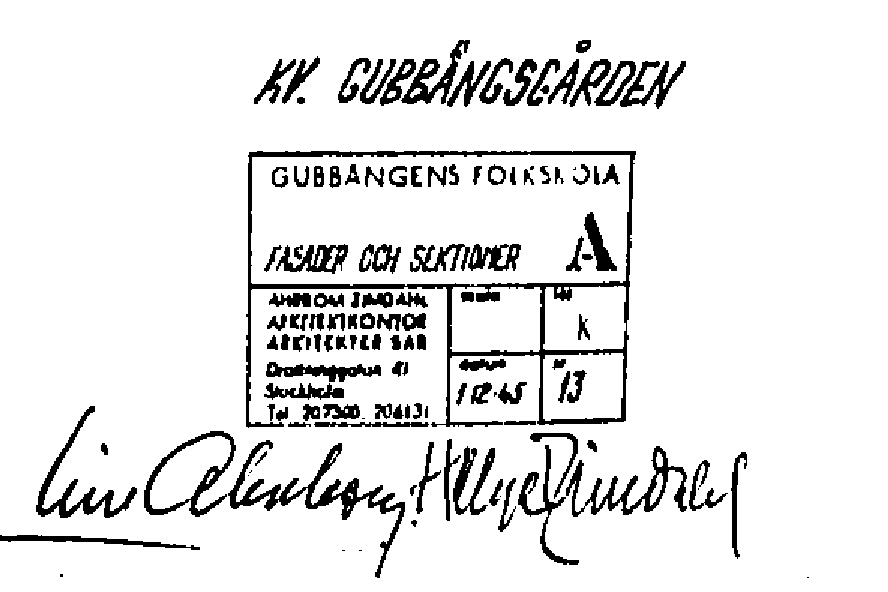
Gubbängens folk school, drawing stamp with signature of Ahrbom and Zimdahl, 1945.

During the 1930s and 1940s, Ahrbom & Zimdal designed a large number of schools in many Swedish cities, for example in Ludvika, Motala, Skara and Enköping. In Stockholm, the architect's office designed Eriksdalsskolan and Eriksdalshallen (1937), Södra flickläroverket (1943) and Gubbängen folk school and gymnasium, among others.

In 1950 Ahrbom ended the collaboration with Helge Zimdal and they went their separate ways. Ahrbom carried out assignments on his own for the Swedish Construction Agency as well as investigations and projects for embassies in Tokyo, Ankara, Beijing and Cairo (1971).

Ahrbom was professor of architecture at the Royal Institute of Technology in Stockholm 1942–1963 and castle architect at Vadstena castle. Ahrbom was elected in 1952 as a member of the Royal Swedish Academy of Sciences and in 1958 as a member of the Swedish Academy of Engineering Sciences.

In 1986, he was awarded the Academy of Engineers' big gold medal "for his distinguished life's work as a practicing architect and as an educator, critic and giver of ideas".

== Photo gallery ==
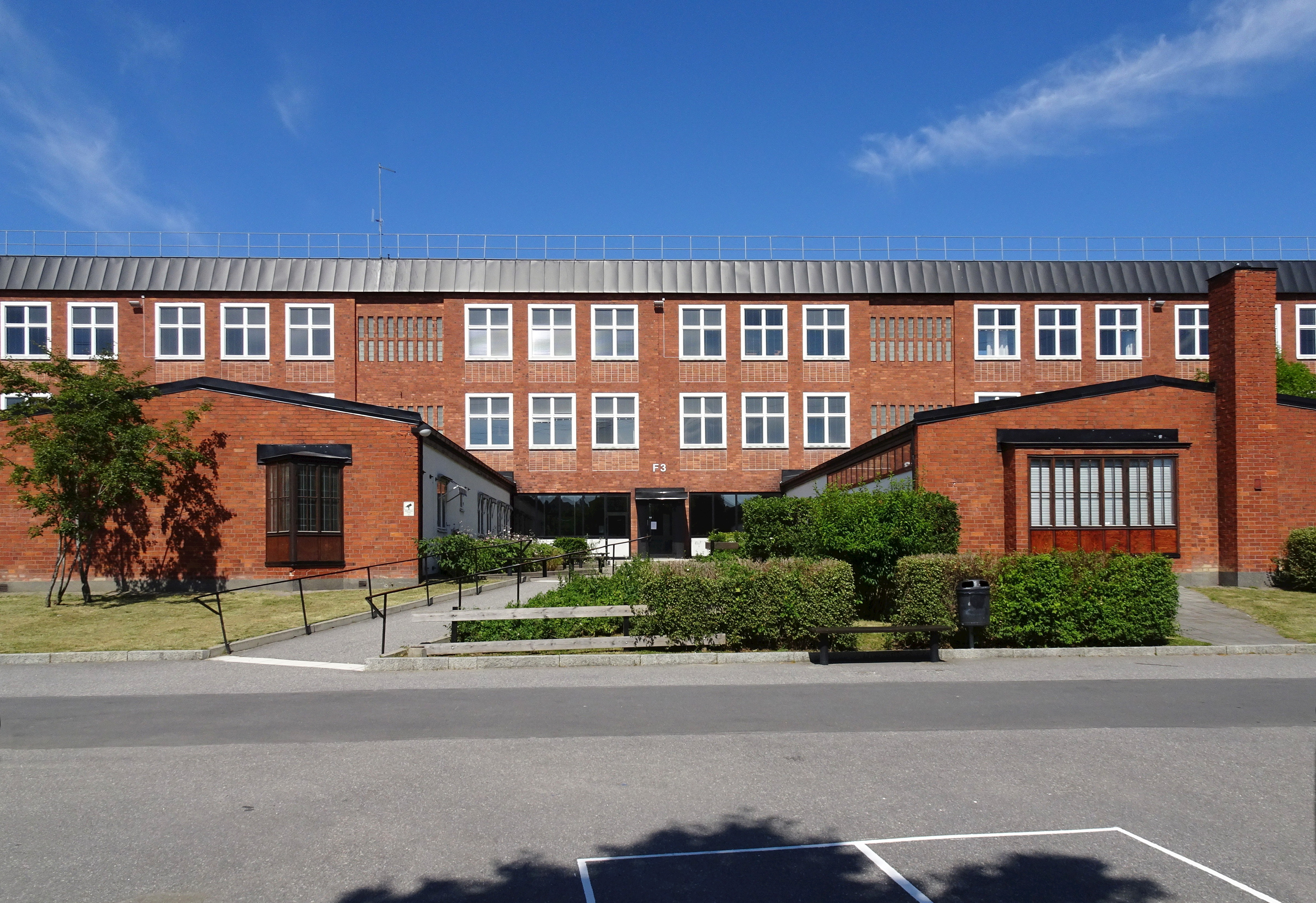
Gubbängen's high school

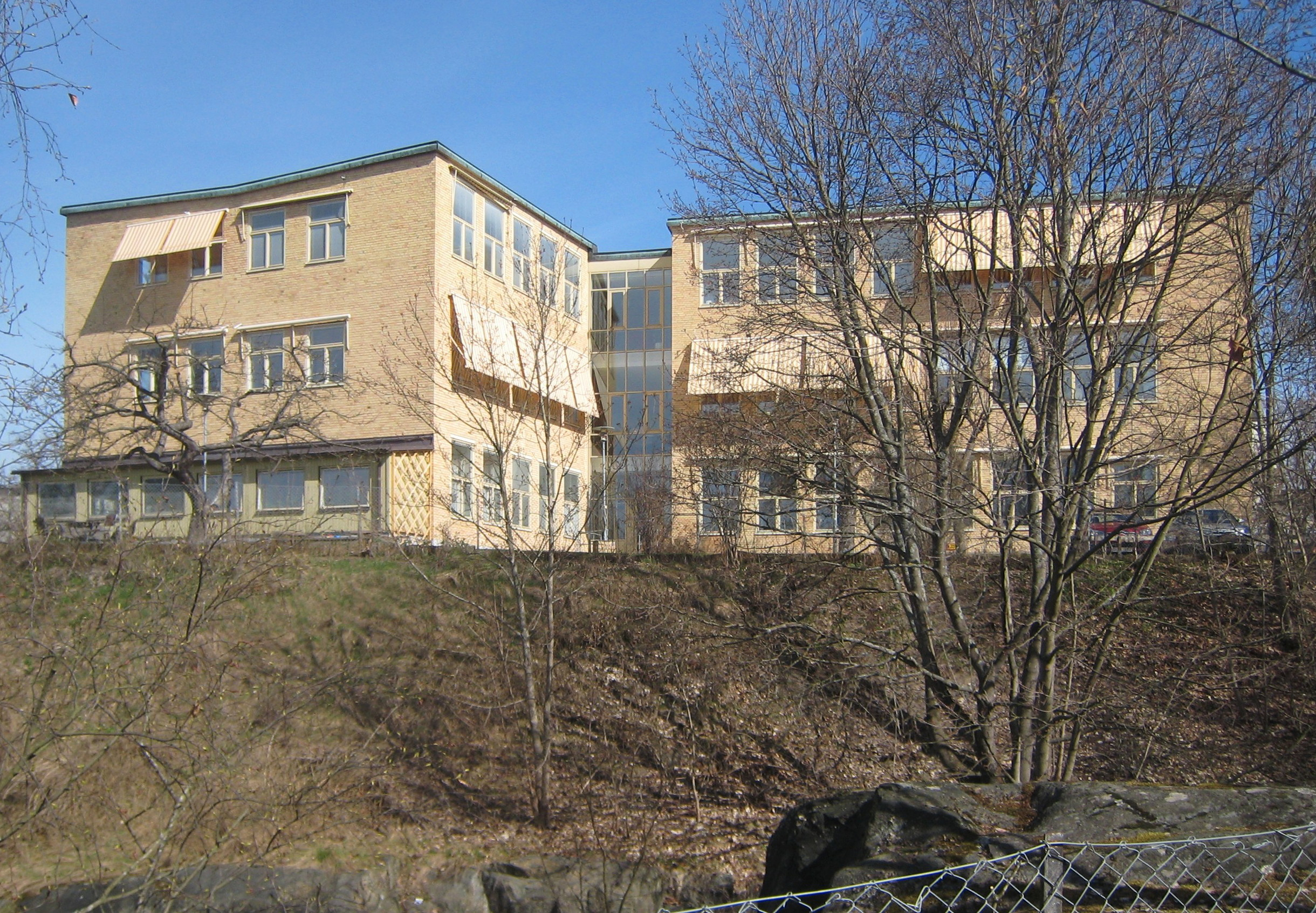
Eriksdal School
