= Södra Ängby =

Residential area in Stockholm, Sweden

Coordinates: 59°20′28″N 17°53′45″E

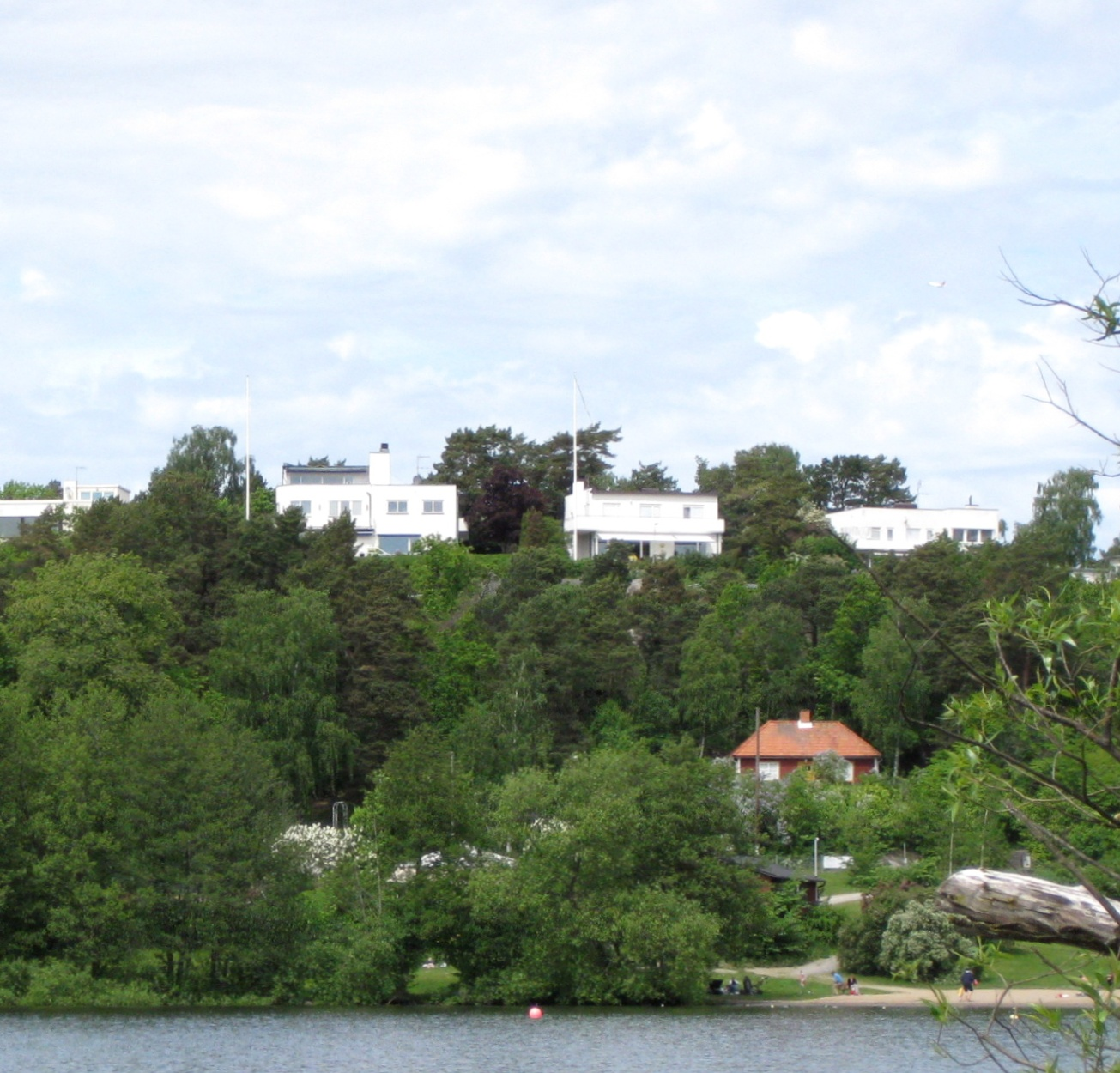
Södra Ängby in 2010.

Södra Ängby is a residential area blending functionalism with garden city ideals, located in western Stockholm, Sweden, forming part of the Bromma borough.

Encompassing more than 500 buildings, it remains the largest coherent functionalistic villa area in Sweden and possibly the world, still well-preserved more than half a century after its construction 1933–40 and protected as a national cultural heritage.

The area covers 1.1 square kilometres, and is inhabited by 1,744 people.

== History ==
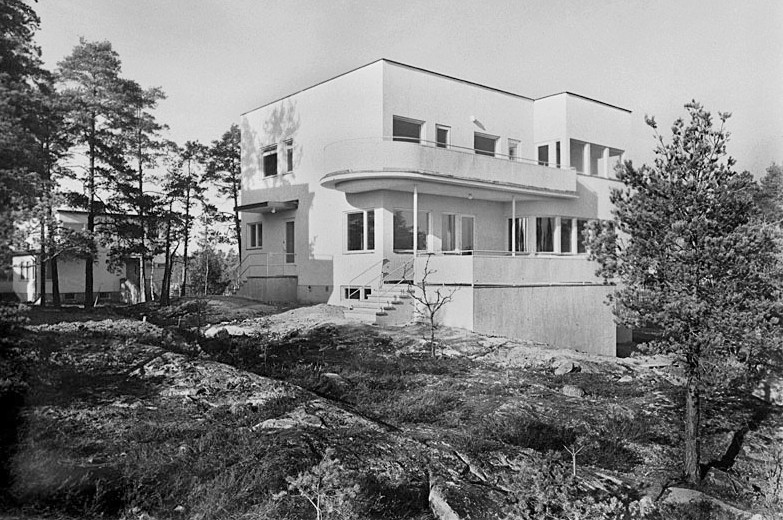
Newly built villa in Södra Ängby in 1938.

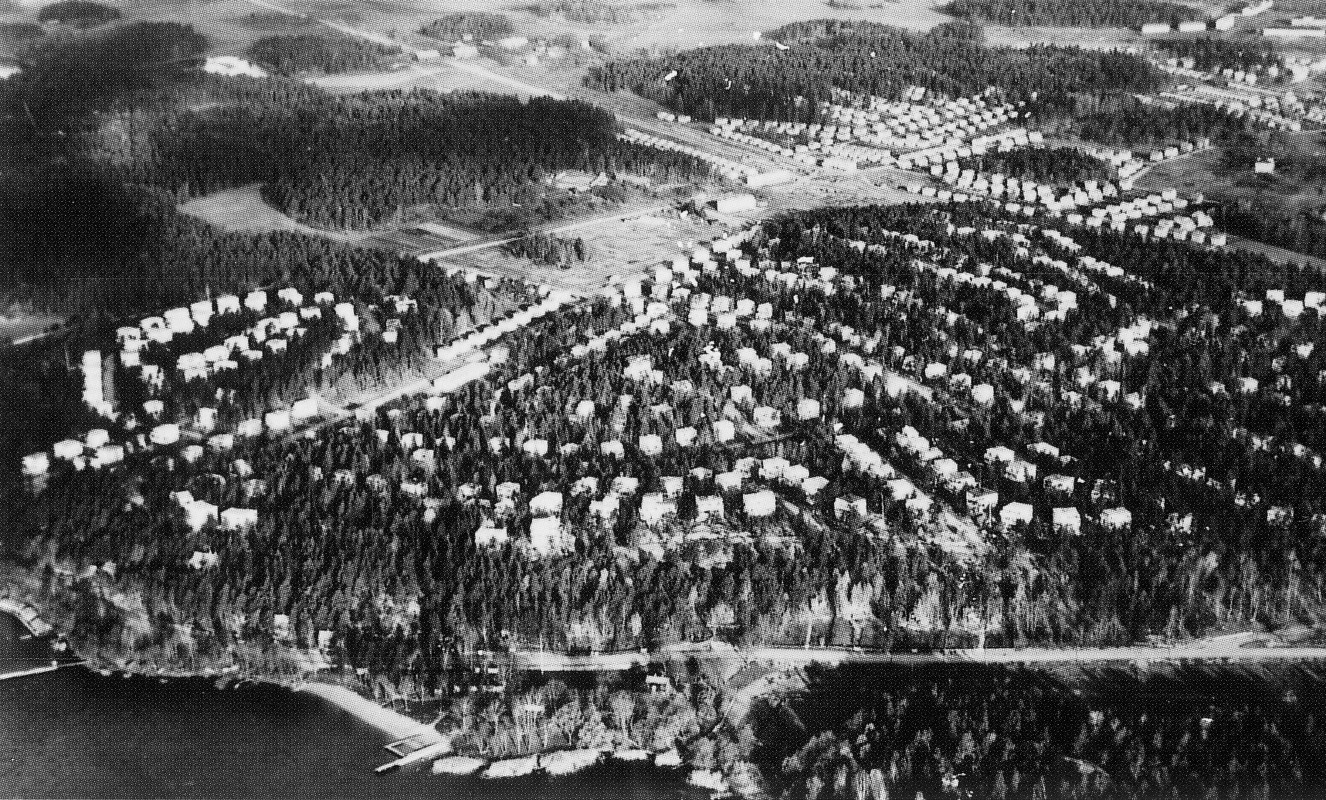
Aerial view of Södra Ängby, 1938.

While traditional villas and cottages still dominated house production in the early 1930s, a few exclusive villas were built in the new Functionalist style, inspired by the showcases at the Stockholm International Exhibition 1930. One of the earliest examples is the villa architect Sven Markelius, one of the leaders of the exhibition, had built for himself at Nockeby 1930–31. Its strict geometry, its bright plaster façades, and its elevated location with nature left untouched around the building makes it characteristic of villas in Bromma.

While Functionalist villas were also built elsewhere in Stockholm, for example at Stora Essingen and Mälarhöjden, no contemporary suburb could match the extent and execution of Södra Ängby. The Ängby area was bought by the city in 1904 and, due to its flatter terrain, Norra Ängby, the northern area surrounding Ängby Manor, was used for self-built single-family houses starting in 1931. Södra Ängby with its forest and hilly terrain offered more of a challenge. There, roads were adopted to topography while forest was left pretty much untouched, which resulted in the appearance of rows of bright villas scattered across the preserved forest. It was almost entirely the design of Edvin Engström, head of the one-family housing agency of the city's property office (fastighetskontorets egnahembyrå) and the architect behind successful National Romantic residential areas during the 1920s.

All the villas are variations on a strict functionalistic theme: Cubic volumes, flat-rolled sheet roofs, large windows, and rounded balconies adorned with fine plate and forged metal details clearly inspired by ocean liners. In Stockholm, most suburbs are centred on a small square, but at Södra Ängby the commercial centre is a row of peripheral Functionalist buildings located near the present metro station. On its completion, city construction director (stadsbyggnadsdirektör) Göran Sidenbladh referred to Södra Ängby as "the last garden city".

Functionalist details, 2008

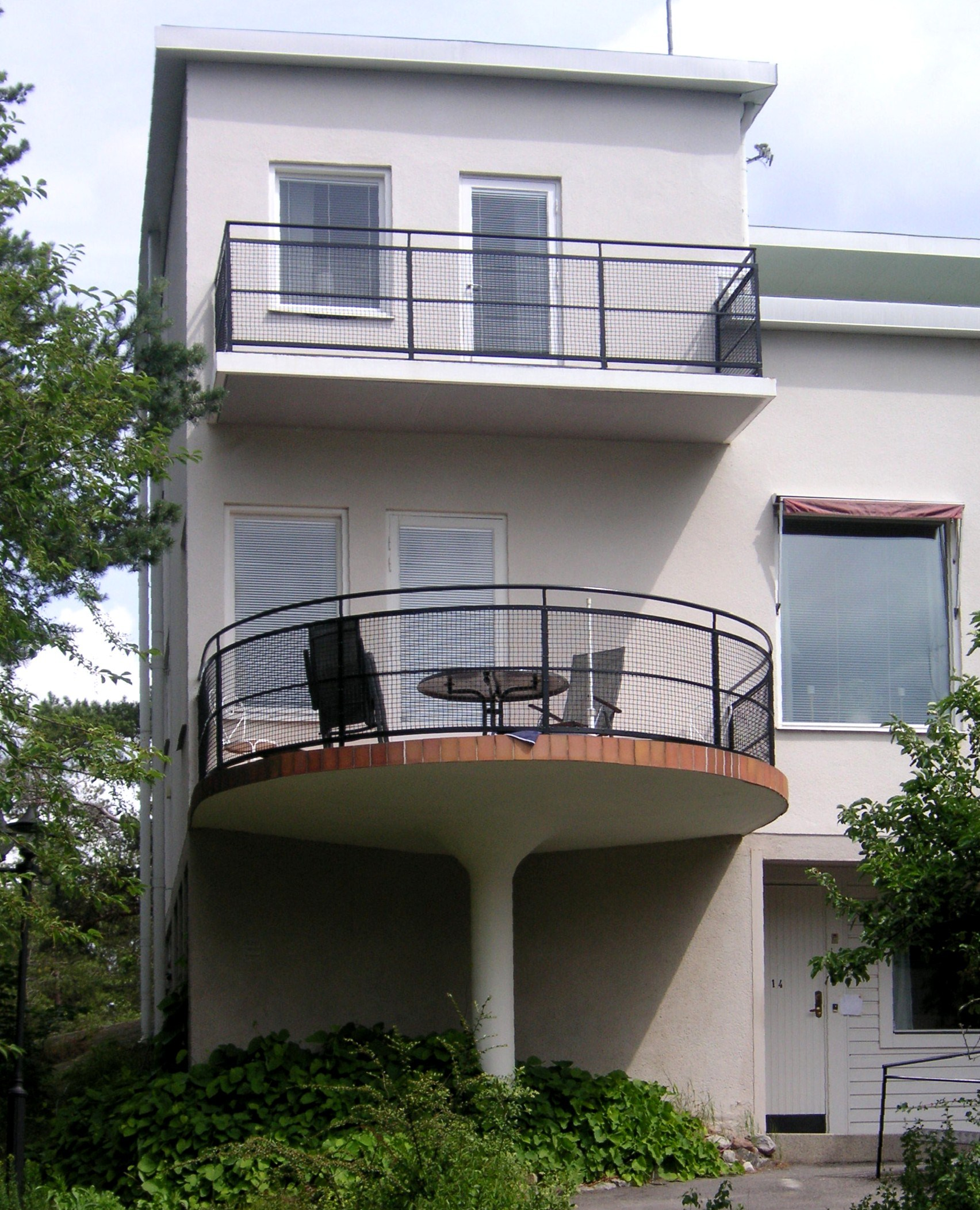

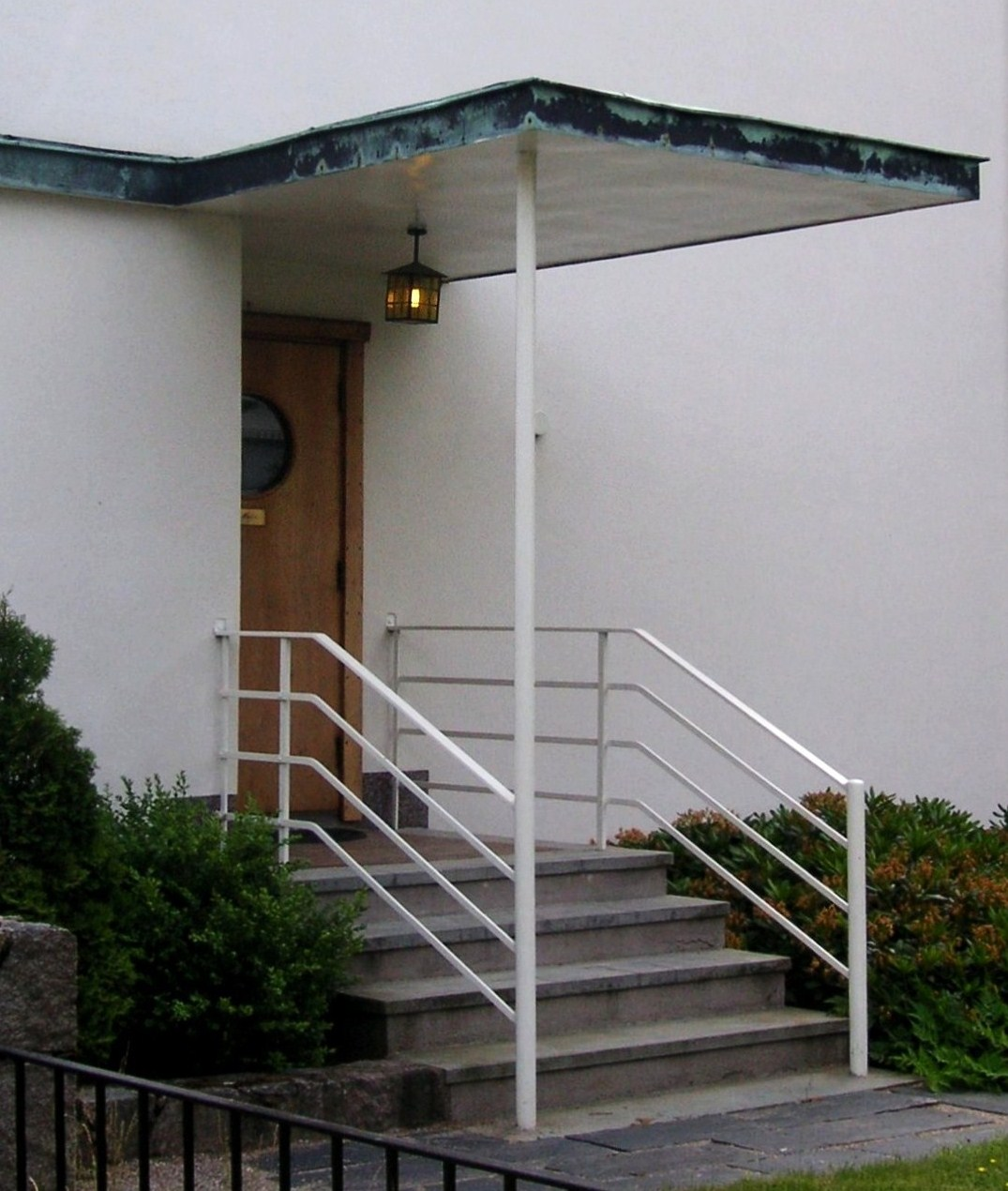

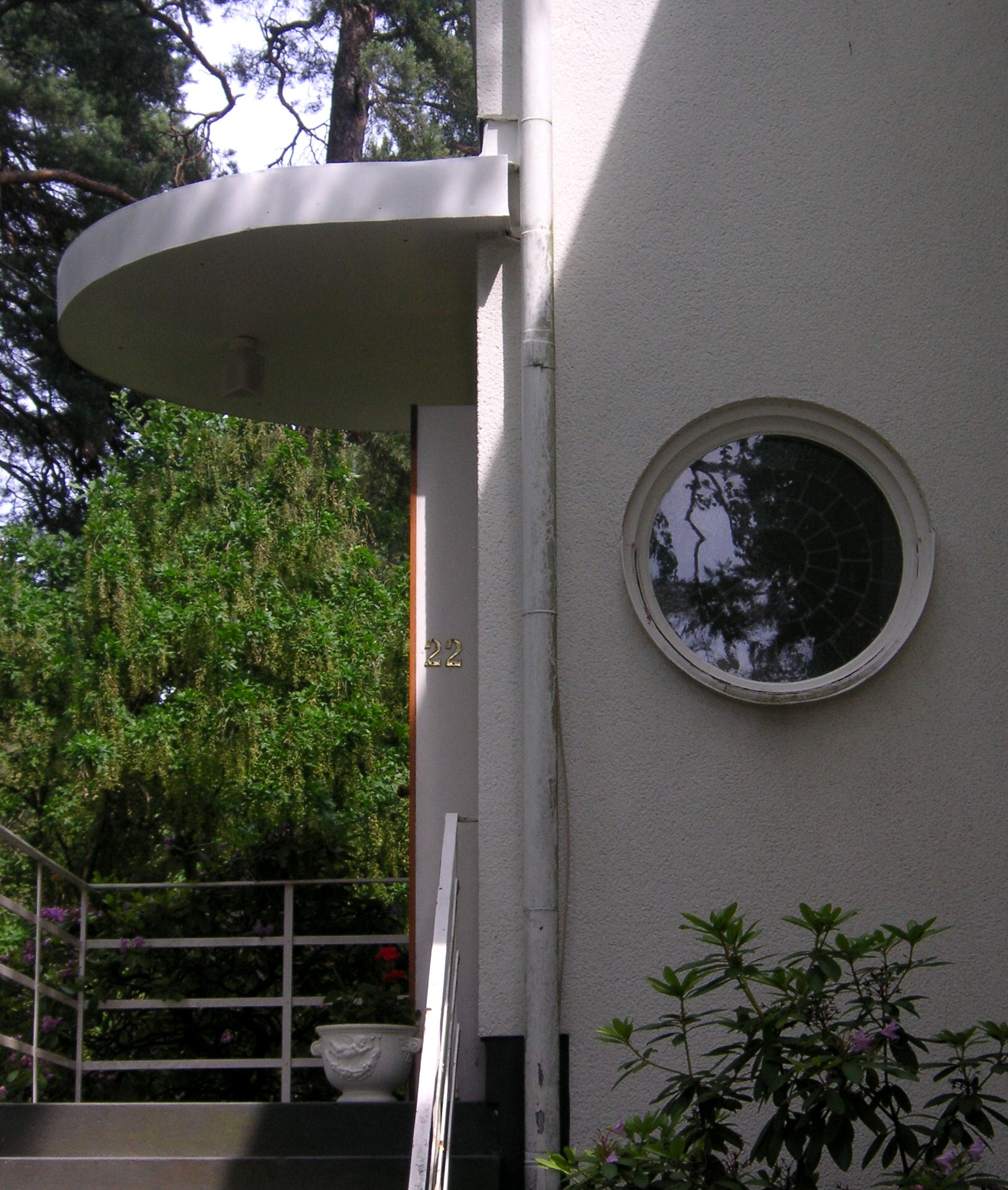

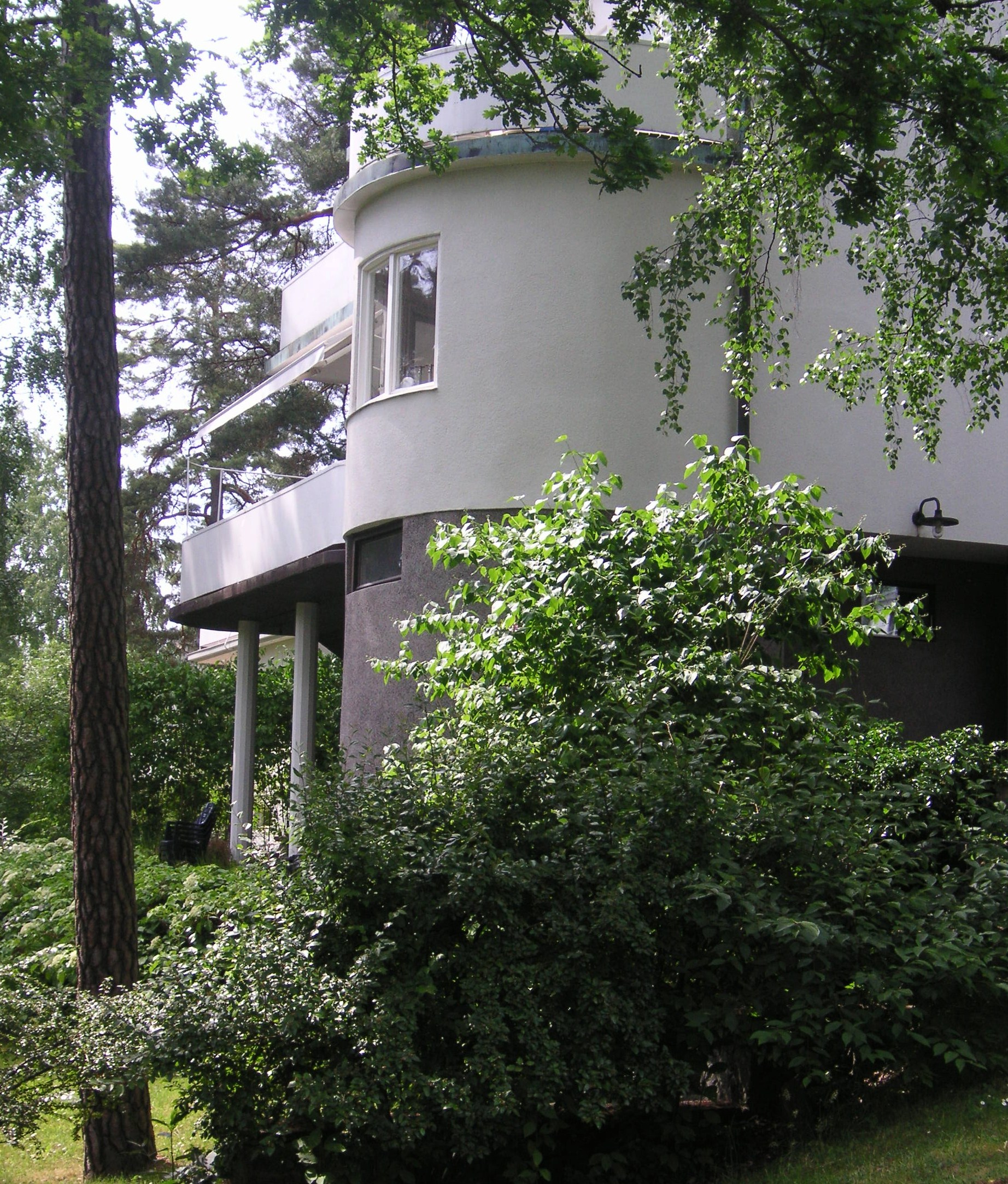

== See also ==
- White City, contemporaneous modernist urban area in Tel Aviv, Israel
