= Beaux-Arts Apartments =

Residential buildings in Manhattan, New York

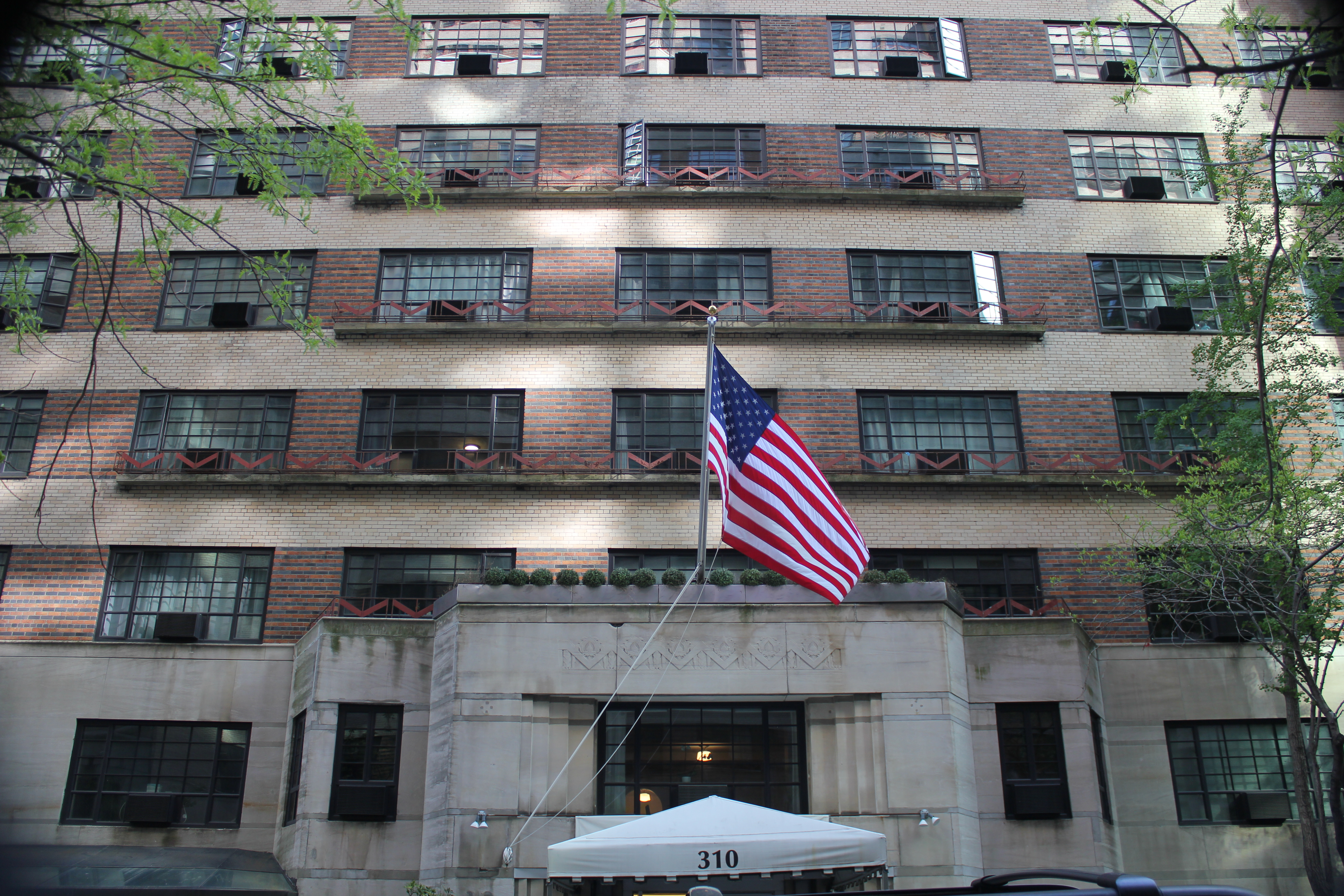
- Seen in 2021
- Interactive map of the Beaux-Arts Apartments area

General information
- Type: Residential
- Location: Manhattan, New York, US, 307 East 44th Street; 310 East 44th Street
- Coordinates: 40°45′04″N 73°58′13″W
- Construction started: February 1929
- Completed: January 1930
- Owner: The Brodsky Organization

Technical details
- Material: Brick, limestone, glass (facade)
- Floor count: 17

Design and construction
- Architects: Raymond Hood, Kenneth Murchison
- Main contractor: George A. Fuller Company

New York City Landmark
- Designated: July 11, 1989
- Reference no.: 1668, 1669

The Beaux-Arts Apartments are a pair of apartment towers on 307 and 310 East 44th Street in the East Midtown and Turtle Bay neighborhoods of Manhattan in New York City. Designed by Raymond Hood and Kenneth Murchison, the Beaux-Arts Apartments were constructed between 1929 and 1930. The complex was originally designed with 640 apartments.

The Beaux-Arts Apartments consist of two towers on East 44th Street; number 307 is on the north sidewalk while number 310 is on the south sidewalk. The two towers are 16 stories and are faced with limestone at the base, dark brick between windows on the upper stories, and light brick between each story. The top four stories of both buildings contain numerous setbacks, which form terraces for the upper-story units. The interiors largely consist of studio apartments measuring 22 by 13 feet (6.7 by 4.0 m) on average; they are lit by large windows on the outside. The ground floor of the south building, number 310, contains a cafe.

The apartment complex was built just east of the Beaux-Arts Institute of Design, which had moved to the area in 1928. Plans for the apartment complex were announced in February 1929, with the buildings being financed by stock issues rather than mortgage loans. The buildings opened to residents in January 1930 during the Great Depression. The Beaux-Arts Apartments avoided foreclosure due to their financing arrangement and were initially popular among businesswomen. The buildings were sold to the Brodsky Organization in 1973 and the New York City Landmarks Preservation Commission designated the complex as a city landmark in 1988.

== Site ==
The Beaux-Arts Apartments are a pair of apartment towers on 307 and 310 East 44th Street, between Second Avenue and First Avenue, in the East Midtown and Turtle Bay neighborhoods of Manhattan in New York City. 307 East 44th Street is on the north side of the street, while 310 East 44th Street is on the south side. Number 307's rectangular land lot covers 15,865 square feet (1,473.9 m^{2}), with a frontage of 158 feet (48 m) along 44th Street and a depth of 100.42 feet (30.61 m). Number 310's rectangular land lot covers 17,572 square feet (1,632.5 m^{2}), with a frontage of 175 feet (53 m) along 44th Street and a depth of 100.42 feet (30.61 m). Number 310 is directly between Three United Nations Plaza to the east and the Beaux-Arts Institute of Design building at 304 East 44th Street to the west. Directly east of number 307 are One and Two United Nations Plaza (which contain the Millennium Hilton New York One UN Plaza hotel). The apartments are also near the Ford Foundation Building to the south, as well as the Church Center for the United Nations to the east.

In the early 20th century, a large portion of Turtle Bay's population was involved in the arts or architecture. Structures such as the Beaux-Arts Institute of Design and the residential Turtle Bay Gardens, Tudor City, and Beekman Tower were constructed for this community. William Lescaze's renovation of an existing brownstone townhouse on 48th Street, and its subsequent conversion into the Lescaze House, inspired similar renovations to other structures in the neighborhood, such as 219 East 49th Street.

== Architecture ==
Both apartment blocks were designed by Raymond Hood and Kenneth Murchison as 17-story towers, though only 16 stories are visible from the street. The George A. Fuller Company was the general contractor for both structures. Both buildings contain steel-framed superstructures. The interiors of the apartment units were designed by multiple architects. The arrangement of the towers across each other was intended to make 44th Street appear as a courtyard.

=== Facade ===
The facades of the buildings are nearly identical. The north building at 307 East 44th Street is eleven bays wide, while the south building at 310 East 44th Street is twelve bays wide. The massings of both buildings are designed similarly, and the apartment towers themselves are arranged symmetrically in a similar manner to Beaux-Arts structures. The main sections are recessed 8 feet (2.4 m) behind their respective sidewalks, with plantings in front. On either end of both buildings are pavilions, which protrude to the sidewalk at their first thirteen stories. To comply with the 1916 Zoning Resolution, both buildings contain setbacks on the 13th through 16th stories, similar to the Art Deco skyscrapers of New York City. The design of the neighboring 3 United Nations Plaza's facade was inspired by the Beaux-Arts Apartments.

==== Base ====
On both apartment blocks, the 44th Street facade of the first two stories is clad with limestone, interspersed with horizontal bands of chrome. The use of horizontal bands gave the facade an industrial appearance. The western ends of the buildings' ground stories are slightly beneath the sidewalk, and there are small planted areas behind iron railings. The planting beds in front of each building are 8 feet (2.4 m) deep. Ground-story studio apartments had their own private entrances directly to the street. At both buildings, ground-story doors and windows are covered by iron grilles, which are designed as grids of rhombuses, while the walls have triangular lighting fixtures. The only difference at ground level is that, in the south building, the ground story east of the entrance has a glass-and-aluminum wall enclosing a restaurant, rather than plantings. Directly east of the south building is a colonnade, which leads to an open-air courtyard separating the south building from Three United Nations Plaza.

The centers of either building have a double-height entrance pavilion that protrudes to the street, with angled bays containing casement windows on either side. The glass entrance doors and the central second-story window are both flanked by stepped jambs. A carved geometric frieze is above the second-floor opening of each pavilion. A metal railing, with chevron-shaped balusters, surrounds the balcony on top of each entrance pavilion.

==== Upper stories ====
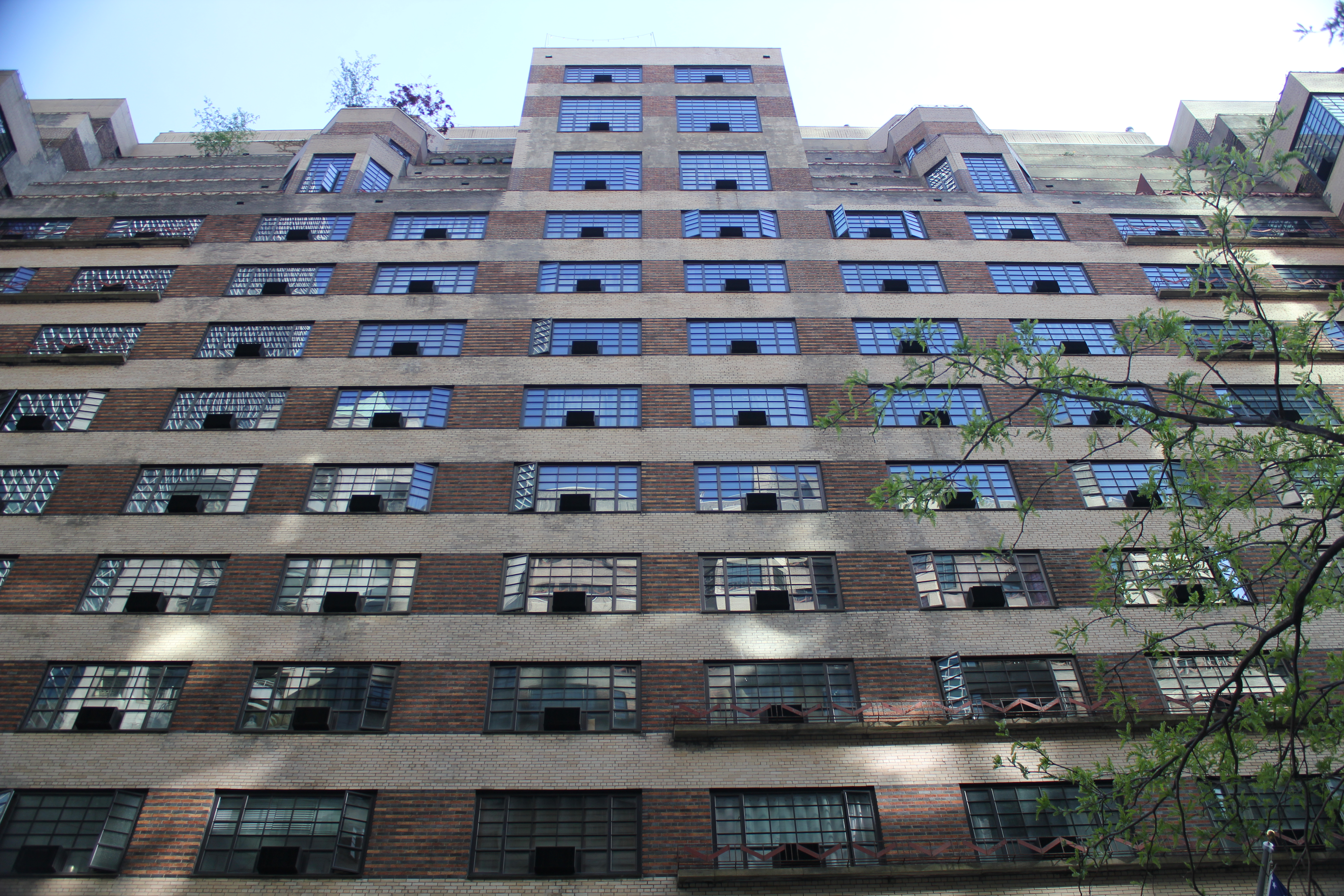
The top of the facade at 310 East 44th Street has two squared bays at center. The two second-from-center bays are angled.

On each of the buildings' upper stories, there are wide steel casement windows. The buildings have a variety of window styles such as single, double, and triple two-part casements as well as corner windows. On both buildings, the triple casement windows are the most common. The end pavilions contain windows that wrap around the corners of the facade. These corner windows, which were included to show that the exterior walls are non-structural, were built with minimal vertical mullions to avoid obstructing views. According to Hood, the design of the windows "takes away from the waffle-like character of the usual factory design". There was 60 percent more glass than in comparable buildings, according to both architects. Chevron-shaped Art Deco-style railings, similar in design to those above the entrance pavilions, are used on some of the upper stories.

The windows on each story are separated vertically by panels of alternating red and black brick. This created "stripes" similar to those used on the Daily News Building, which Hood had also designed. These stripes were placed between windows on the same floor, in a manner more akin to the International Style, rather than between windows in the same bay on different floors, as was typical of the Art Deco style. The spandrels between the windows on different stories are continuous horizontal bands of light-colored buff brick. Hood said the spandrels were intended to give the structures a horizontal emphasis, which fit the shapes of each building. The end pavilions are clad with light-colored brick similar to that used on the spandrels between different stories.

The designs of the main facades are continued on the western and eastern sides of both buildings. The buildings' western and eastern sides are exposed to varying extents, but all have dark brick stripes at their centers, behind which are stairwells. Some portions of the south building's eastern side have a stucco wall rather than brick cladding; the stucco indicates the silhouette of a former four-story building to the east.

On the 13th through 16th stories of both buildings, there are setbacks facing 44th Street, which form terraces on each story. In either building, six of the bays contain setbacks of uniform depth on each story. The remaining bays (five in the north building and six in the south building) are set back in a different pattern. In each building, these consist of the center (one bay in the north, two in the south); the second-bay on either side of the center; and the outermost bays. (Note: The center, second-from-center, and outermost bays on each building contain different setback patterns from the six other bays.: In the north building, these are the 1st, 4th, 6th, 8th, and 11th bays from west. The 1st and 11th bays are the outermost, and the 6th bay is at the center. The 4th and 8th bays are the second-from-center.; In the south building, these are the 1st, 4th, 6th, 7th, 9th, and 12th bays from west. The 1st and 12th bays are the outermost, and the 6th and 7th bays are at the center. The 4th and 9th bays are the second-from-center.) The center and outermost bays of each building contain square profiles, while the second-from-center bays are angled. The center bay(s) have a setback only at the 16th story, and the other four bays have setbacks on each of the 14th through 16th stories. Mechanical brick penthouses are on the roofs of both buildings. The rear of the north building contains terraces with gradual setbacks, but the rear of the south building is not visible from the street. Murchison wrote that the setbacks were included to "add to the desirability of many apartments". Architectural writer Christopher Gray compared the massing of the upper stories to a jigsaw puzzle.

=== Interior ===
==== Lower stories ====
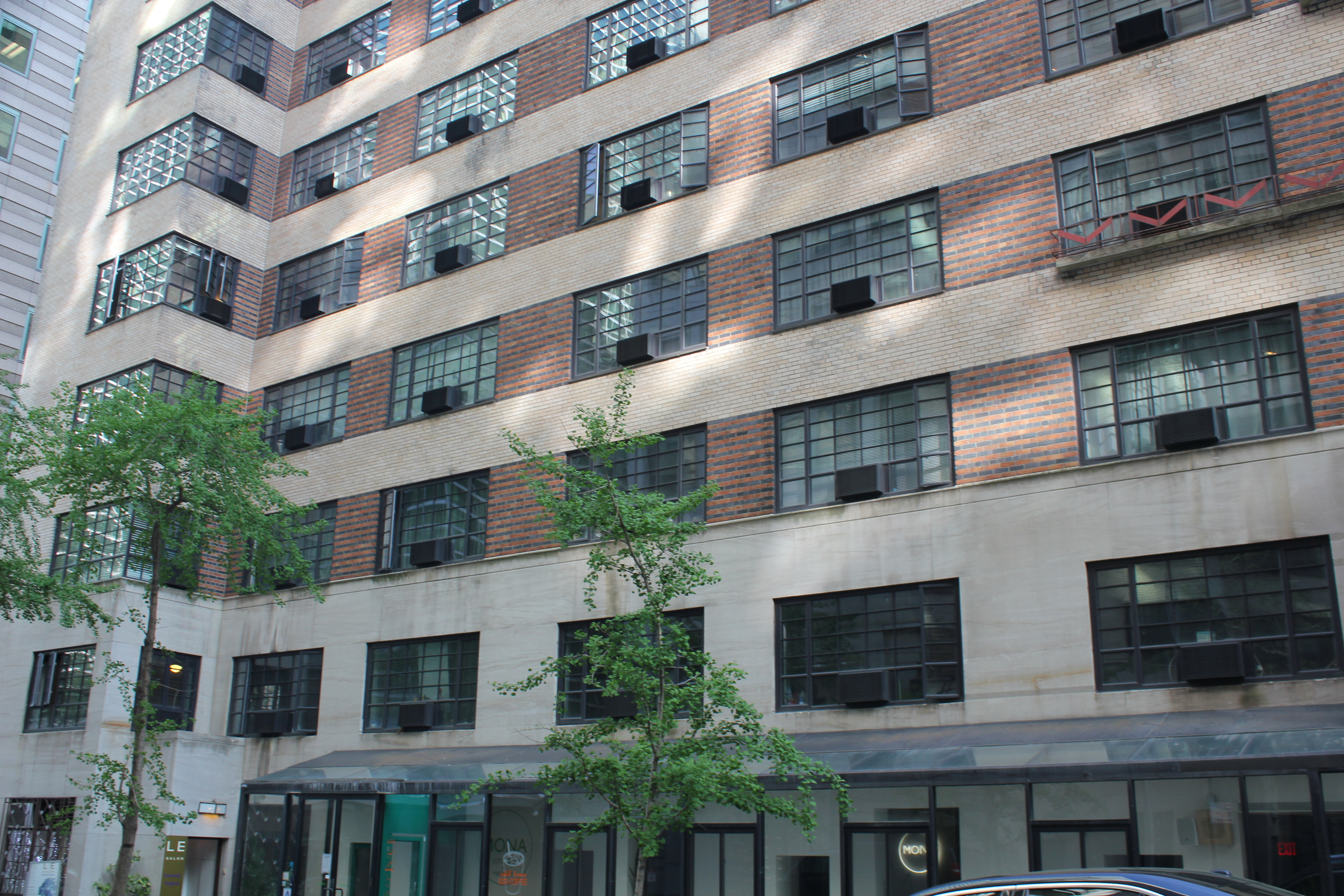
Restaurant area at the base of 310 East 44th Street

Initially, the lobbies of both buildings were decorated in a modern style, with side walls made of brown glass, interspersed with aluminum and brass trim. The lobbies were also decorated with strips of chrome, and the ceilings were adorned with silver leaf motifs. The modernist style was continued in the elevator cabs, which had glass-rod ceilings and lacquered aluminum walls. According to Murchison, the metal-paneled walls of the elevators were designed without mirrors "just to hide from yourself your own appearance when you come in at 4 A.M."

The ground story of number 310 had a small restaurant named Cafe Bonaparte, operated in part because most units did not have full-service kitchens. Winold Reiss designed the cafe's rooms with yellow, green, and blue decorations. Cafe Bonaparte was intended to not only provide room service for residents but also serve as a social gathering place. The cafe was also decorated with fabric walls, fluted wainscoting, and a ceiling with zigzagging grilles. A similar ground-floor space in number 307 was originally outfitted with a room-service kitchen but no restaurant. Single-room maisonettes, behind the lobbies and restaurant spaces in either building, extended to the rear of the respective building.

==== Apartments ====
The Beaux-Arts Apartments were arranged with 800 rooms between them, split into 640 residential units. The northern building (number 307) had 328 apartments and seven penthouse apartments, while the southern building (number 310) had 345 apartments and six penthouses. All units from the first to thirteenth stories of each building were arranged as single-room studio apartments. One- to three- bedroom apartments were arranged on and above the fourteenth floor of each building. In both buildings, the walls of even-numbered stories were plastered in white, while the walls of odd-numbered stories were plastered in rough brown. The pantries and bathrooms were plastered in white and the corridors were finished with a rough texture. Cork floors were installed in the studios and communal corridors to provide soundproofing; they were attached directly to the concrete slabs and 2 inches (51 mm) thinner than wooden floors. The cork tiles were 5 to 16 inches (130 to 410 mm) thick and were laid in a random pattern. The corridors are also outfitted with garbage chutes.

The small studio apartments in the Beaux-Arts Apartments typically measure only 22 by 13 feet (6.7 by 4.0 m). These studios were accessed by small foyers with a bathroom, coat closet, pantry, and clothing closet leading off of each foyer. The original furniture in the studio apartments had simple furnishings such as kitchenettes and twin-size folding beds. Though the kitchenettes were not meant for cooking, they were designed to uniform dimensions of 1.58 by 5.5 feet (0.48 by 1.68 m). The upper part of the pantries had a sink and kitchen cabinet, while the lower section had mini-fridges designed by General Electric. There were either one or two folding Murphy beds in the walls of each studio apartment, which were installed on movable tracks in the walls. Single studio apartments also have up to five closets. Bathrooms are arranged so they did not open into living rooms; a small foyer in each studio unit leads to the unit's bathroom. Bathrooms throughout the building are built to a uniform size of 5 by 6.75 feet (1.52 by 2.06 m), with a recessed tub, a small toilet, a sink, and black tiling.

There are also one-and-a-half-story duplex studios on the top floors of each building. The duplex studios' rooms could be as much as 36 by 14 feet (11.0 by 4.3 m) across and 13 feet (4.0 m) high. The arrangement of these duplexes is influenced by the presence of the exterior setbacks. The studios are arranged so two of the larger studios' bedrooms, one on top of the other, span three stories. In the lower duplex units, the studios and bedrooms are both on the 14th floor, but in the upper duplex units, the studio is seven steps below the 16th-floor bedroom and seven steps above the 15th-floor bedroom. Some single-bedroom studios were placed between the one-and-a-half story duplexes. Some of the rooms had galleries with wrought-iron railings, which, according to the original renting agent, gave the impression of a spacious house. The 17th floor of each building contains single-height studios and bedrooms, and the penthouse contains suites with one, two, and three rooms.

== History ==
The Beaux-Arts Institute of Design had been founded to train architects in the style of the French École des Beaux-Arts. During the late 1920s, the Beaux-Arts Institute of Design was housed at 126 East 75th Street on the Upper East Side of Manhattan. The institute hired Hood and Murchison to find a site that was "somewhere nearer the architects' and draftsmen's zone of activity", which was in Turtle Bay. In November 1927, the institute bought a site at 304 and 306 East 44th Street, on which it planned to build a four-story building, for $125,000. The institute dedicated its new building exactly one year later.

=== Construction ===
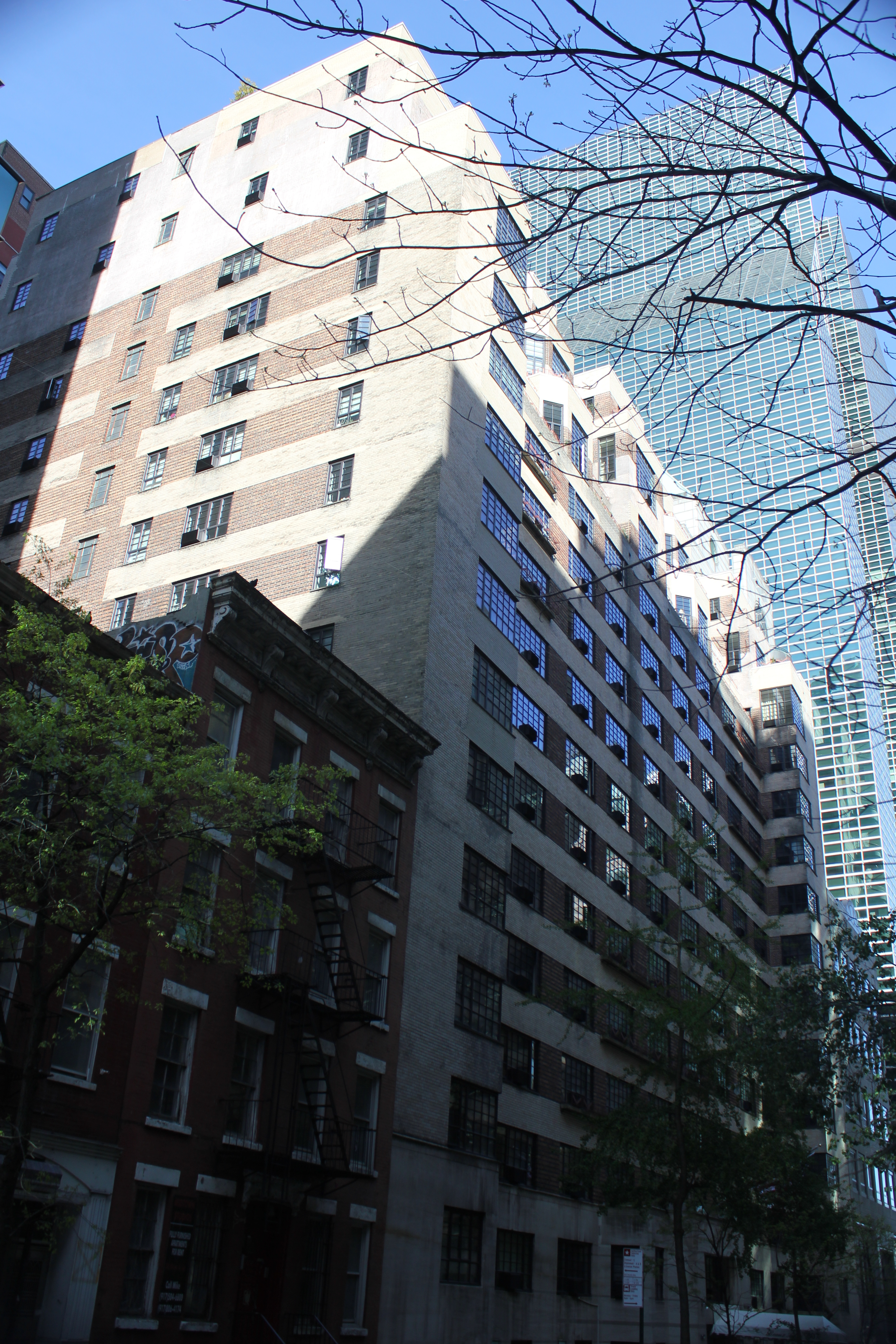
The northern tower at 307 East 44th Street

As the Beaux-Arts Institute of Design was completing its new headquarters, it formed the Beaux-Arts Development Corporation to develop a residential studios near the institute's buildings. Hood and Murchison were selected as the development's architects. According to The New York Times, the architects envisioned buying all the land on the surrounding section of 44th Street, "making of the street a sort of uptown artistic centre" close to Grand Central Terminal. The Times claimed that "this is probably the first time that such a group of artists and allied professions has ever gotten together to develop for their own account real estate in New York".

Hood and Murchison had initially contemplated constructing the entire development as artists' studios, but they abandoned that plan in favor of more traditional apartment construction. At the time of the Beaux-Arts Apartments' construction, artists' studio buildings such as the Gainsborough Studios and Bryant Park Studios generally had high ceilings, but the word "studio" was increasingly being used to refer to small apartments with few rooms. The Beaux-Arts Development Corporation acquired two plots in December 1928, totaling 33,000 feet (10,000 m). These consisted of a site at 308–320 East 44th Street, across from the institute on the north side of the street, as well as a site at 307–317 East 44th Street, right next to the institute on the south side. Douglas Elliman & Co. were hired as the agents for the new buildings to be built on those sites. Plans for the north building, to be designed by Frederick A. Godley and J. André Fouilhoux, were filed the same month.

In February 1929, the National City Company and the United States Realty and Construction Company announced that they would finance the buildings' construction with the sale of stocks in Beaux-Arts Apartments Inc., a syndicate of architects representing the buildings' developer. The financing was the first of its type, as typical buildings were financed with mortgage loans. The financing consisted of common stock, issued on a one-to-one basis with either of two issues of preferred stock, which would raise the $5.25 million construction cost. A total of 93,750 shares were issued. Among the investors in the corporation were Hood and Murchison, as well as architects and designers Chester Holmes Aldrich, John W. Cross, William Adams Delano, William H. Gompert, Charles Klauder, Benjamin Wistar Morris, James W. O'Connor, and Whitney Warren. Work began on the site in March 1929; the next month, the George A. Fuller Company ordered 4,000 short tons (3,600 long tons; 3,600 t) of structural steel from McClintic-Marshall for the two buildings. A resident manager was appointed in November 1929.

=== Early years ===
The Beaux-Arts Apartments were both completed by January 1930. At the time, Douglas Elliman & Co. said many leases for small studios had been signed. In total, 23 people owned all of the buildings' preferred stock. Though most of the investors were architects or otherwise associated with the arts, they also included realtors Douglas L. and Roland Elliman; attorneys Huber B. Lewis, William B. Symmes, and George G. Schreiber; businessmen William Walter Phelps and John Kilpatrick; and the Fuller Construction Company. In spite of the fact that the buildings were completed at the start of the Great Depression and, therefore, had fewer tenants, their financing arrangement was one factor in why neither building went into foreclosure. According to a Douglas Elliman spokesman, the buildings' furnished apartments would help attract tenants faster than non-furnished apartments would. Eight suites in the apartments were furnished for potential tenants to view, including two units designed by Pierre Dutel in contrasting modernist and traditional styles.

The newly completed buildings received an award of "construction merit" from Building Investment Magazine in February 1930. An open-air cafe in the courtyard of the south building opened that June. The Beaux-Arts Apartments were initially especially popular among businesswomen, who comprised more than half of the residents by July 1930. At that point, the buildings had 270 tenants, with an average of fifteen tenants signing leases every week. According to Douglas Elliman's informal survey of residents, one in five female tenants were married but had leased suites in the buildings for the workweek. By 1931, sixty suites in the south building were being operated like a short-term hotel. Most early tenants lived alone or with a partner. Among the first residents were sculptor Jo Davidson and architect Talbot Hamlin, as well as Kenneth Murchison.

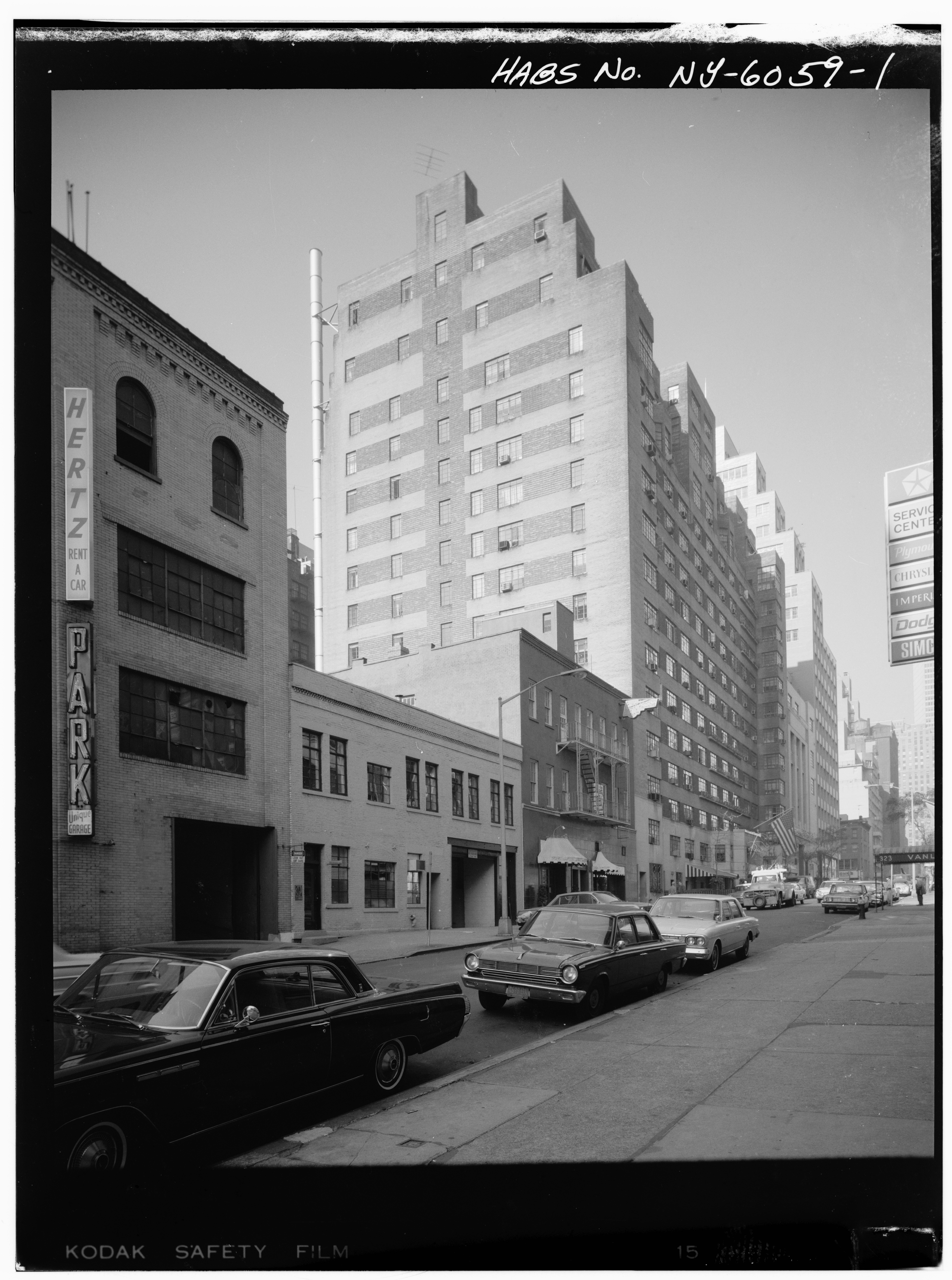
Historic American Buildings Survey image

In March 1933, a shuttle bus route started running between the Beaux-Arts Apartments and Grand Central Terminal. Though the New York Herald Tribune termed it "perhaps the shortest bus route in the country", it carried 50,000 passengers in its first six months, and another route to Rockefeller Center was created that October. The buildings' rear apartments were more difficult to rent in part because they faced commercial concerns that operated at night, making noise. To solve this problem, in 1938, glass-block walls and air conditioning units were installed in some rear units. The same year, Leon and Lionel Levy filed plans to convert the southern apartment block, 310 East 44th Street, into a hotel. The Beaux-Arts Apartments' private bus services to Grand Central and Rockefeller Center were discontinued in 1943 by order of the Office of Defense Transportation; at the time, the buses carried 200 passengers daily.

=== Later years ===
By the late 1960s, both of the Beaux-Arts Apartments were converted to standard residential apartments. The entrances of both structures were overhauled and the original lobby decorations were removed entirely. In 1968, the United Nations proposed building a set of twin towers on the entire block bounded by 43rd Street, First Avenue, 45th Street, and Second Avenue, serving as an expansion of its headquarters one block east. This would have entailed destroying the Beaux-Arts Apartments, whose owners expressed surprise at the proposal and said they would continue to operate the apartment buildings. While the UN proposal was slightly modified in late 1969, the plans still called for demolishing the apartments. The UN ultimately decided instead to build a skyscraper on a smaller lot rather than raze the site.

Beaux-Arts Properties sold the Beaux-Arts Apartments to the Brodsky Organization for $8.1 million in 1973. Brodsky said at the time that it would continue to maintain the building. Under Brodsky, the southern apartment block at 310 East 44th Street was converted from a hotel to residential apartments; this was one of several residential conversions Brodsky performed during that time. With the expansion of the UN headquarters in the 1970s and 1980s, all of the neighboring buildings to the east were demolished, and new structures were erected, blocking the Beaux-Arts Apartments' eastern facades. One and Two United Nations Plaza and the Kuwaiti and Nigerian missions to the United Nations were built on the north side of the street, on both sides of 307 East 44th Street, while the UNICEF headquarters and UN Church Center were built on the south side, adjacent to 310 East 44th Street. The residents of the Beaux-Arts Apartments could not have large gatherings on 44th Street for over a decade, since the street had to be closed for construction.

On July 11, 1989, the New York City Landmarks Preservation Commission designated the buildings as city landmarks. The upper floors were refurbished in 1997 as part of a $120,000 project, and a Burmese restaurant opened within 310 East 44th Street in April 2024. The buildings continue to be operated by the Brodsky Organization as of 2025. Brodsky sued Bruklyn Builders' and Triangle Assets (which was developing a neighboring building at 303 East 44th Street) in early 2025, claiming that the construction project had caused damage to 307 East 44th Street.

== Critical reception ==
When the buildings were completed in 1930, the New York Herald Tribune called the apartments "a type of building distinctly different and yet lacking none of the conveniences expected and demanded in modern apartments". Upon Hood's death in 1934, a few years after the buildings' completion, the New York Daily News called the buildings "among the finest modern achievements in architecture", along with Hood's American Radiator Building, Daily News Building, and McGraw Hill Building. In the book New York 1930, architectural writer Robert A. M. Stern characterized the buildings as the "most interesting side street apartments" of the period between the two world wars. In 1997, Christopher Gray wrote an article headlined "A Matched Pair of 1930 Monuments to Art Deco" for The New York Times, in which he said of the ongoing restoration: "the original jazz-age optimism of this unusual project is more idea than reality".

== See also ==
- List of New York City Designated Landmarks in Manhattan from 14th to 59th Streets
