= Three United Nations Plaza =

Building in Manhattan, New York

UNICEF Headquarters
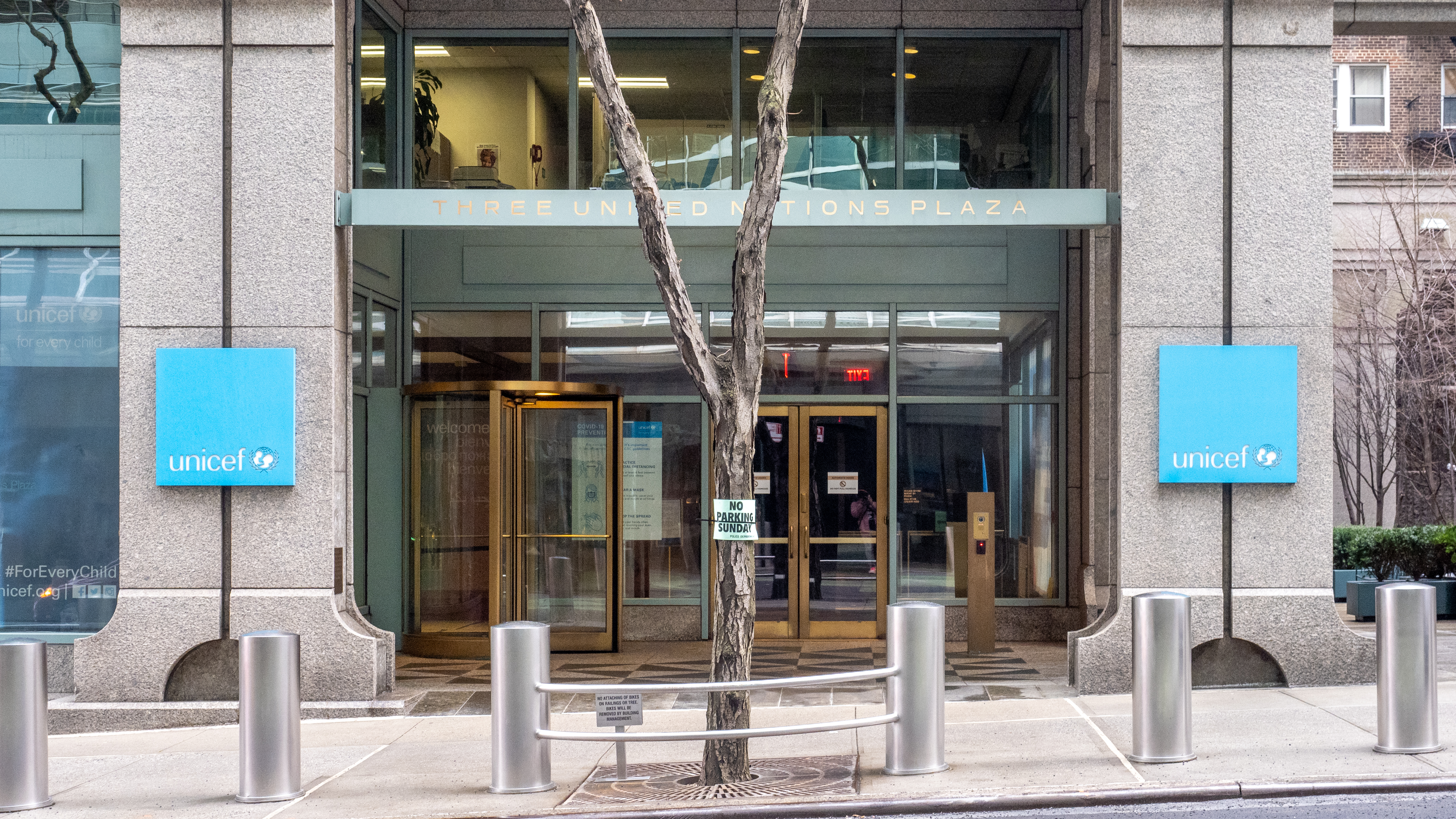
- 3 UN Plaza, or UNICEF Headquarters on 44th Street, New York City.
- Interactive map of the UNICEF Headquarters area
- Former names: Three UN Plaza
- Hotel chain: Hilton Hotels

General information
- Type: Office
- Architectural style: Post Modern
- Location: 3 United Nations Plaza, Manhattan, New York City, United States
- Coordinates: 40°45′01″N 73°58′11″W
- Current tenants: UNICEF
- Completed: 1987; 39 years ago
- Owner: UNDC and Millennium & Copthorne Hotels
- Landlord: UNDC & Millennium & Copthorne Hotels

Height
- Architectural: Post Modern

Technical details
- Material: steel (frame)

Design and construction
- Architect: Kevin Roche
- Architecture firm: Roche-Dinkeloo

Website
- undc.org

Three United Nations Plaza is a mixed-use building in Turtle Bay, Manhattan that was designed for the United Nations by Kevin Roche. It is located across First Avenue from the UN headquarters in Midtown Manhattan of New York City. Three UN Plaza, or UNICEF Headquarters is on the south side of 44th Street. The United Nations Development Corporation or UNDC is a quasi-public institution that developed and presently operates One, Two, and Three UN Plaza. UNDC operates all of Three UN Plaza. As the name suggests, UNDC's principal tenants are the United Nations, the UN Development Programme, UNICEF, and other missions to the UN. Three UN Plaza was built in 1986. UNICEF is its only tenant.

Three UN Plaza (also referred to as "Three"), which opened in 1987, is a 15-story office building located on the south side of 44th Street between First and Second Avenues, across from One and Two UN Plaza. It is next door to another landmark building, the Beaux-Arts Apartments. Three's property includes approximately 205,000 square feet (19,000 m^{2}) of office space, with an adjacent public plaza of approximately 5,000 square feet (460 m^{2}). Three UN Plaza is leased exclusively to UNICEF for its world headquarters. It was built in postmodern design.

The properties of One, Two, and Three UN Plaza are located on the East Side of Midtown Manhattan along the East River, in an area of Manhattan known as Turtle Bay.

== Description ==
Three UN Plaza, or known today as UNICEF World Headquarters, is a fifteen-story building on East 44th Street, that was designed by Roche-Dinkeloo and built 1984–1987. It was known as KRJDA Project number 8303 and has 230,000 square feet (21,000 m^{2}) of office space. The UNDC commissioned Roche-Dinkeloo to construct Three UN Plaza, the last of the three major buildings in the UN Plaza complex of buildings. Kevin Roche then headed the Roche-Dinkeloo team, as John Dinkeloo had died in 1981. It was built to provide office space, a conference room and headquarters for the United Nations International Children's Emergency Fund, or UNICEF. The building is situated on the south side of 44th Street, across the street from One and Two UN Plaza. It stands in out-and-out contrast to both of its neighbors, One and Two UN Plaza, and its neighbor to the west, the Beaux-Arts Apartments. The Beaux-Arts Apartments neighbors are paired towers at 307 and 310 East 44th Street respectively, designed by Raymond Hood and Kenneth MacKenzie Murchison. Directly across the street on East 44th Street are Towers One and Two and the hotel's lobby entrance.

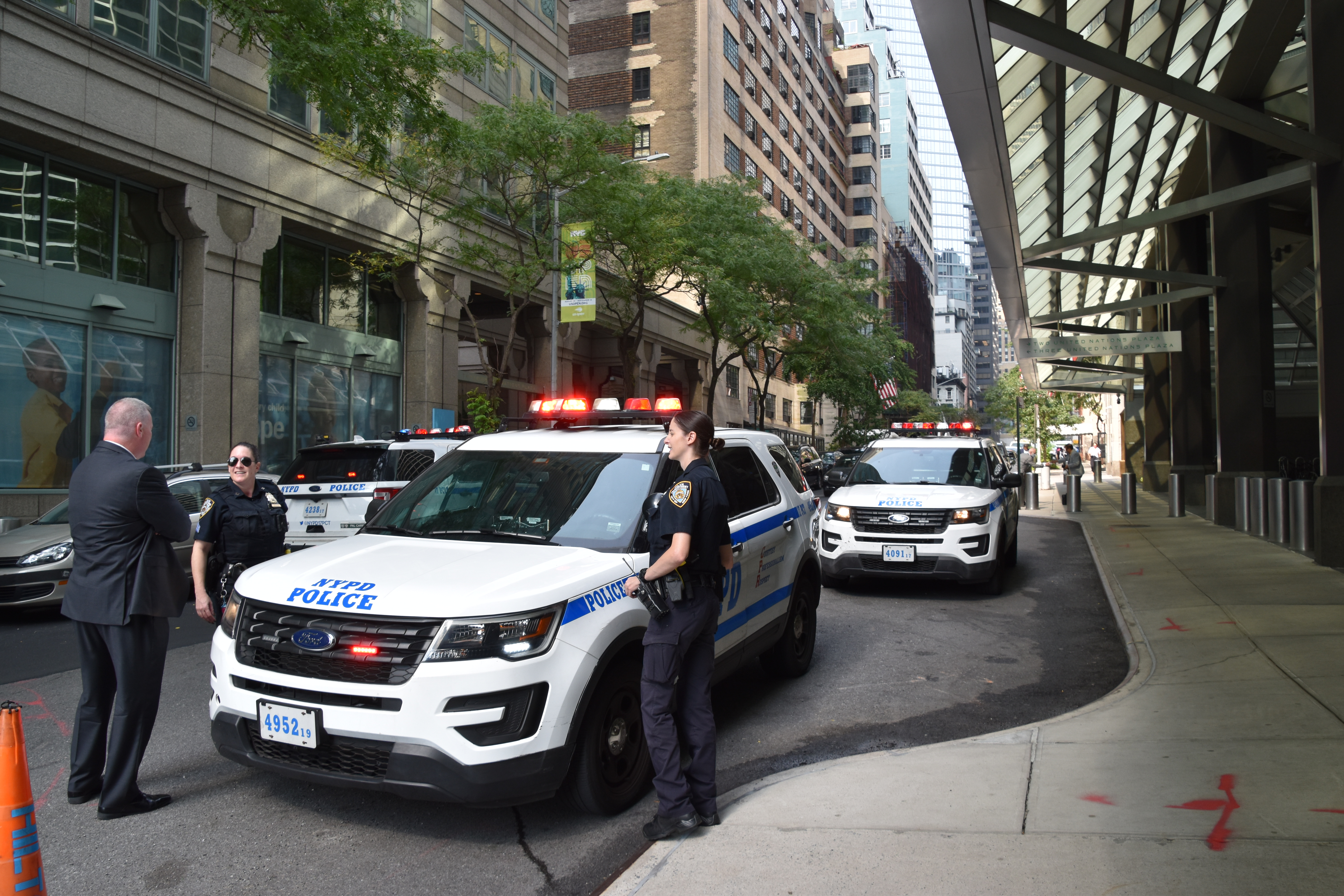
Front entrance of 3 UN Plaza on the left, and One and Two UN Plaza hotel's lobby entrance on the right. Note overhanging porte-cochere surrounding Towers 1 and 2.

=== Form and facade ===
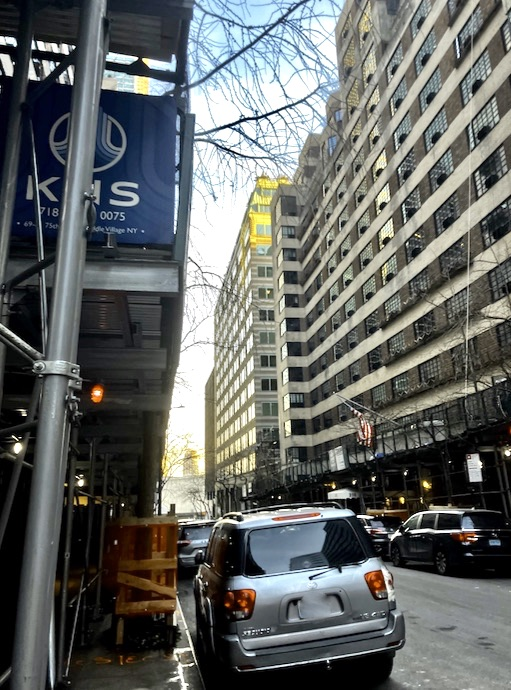
View southeast from north side of 44th street near 2nd Ave, seeing Beaux-Arts Apartments, then Three United Nations Plaza further east.

Three UN Plaza has a massive-appearing two-story stone base, which is lined by columns. On top of this is a thirteen-story-high façade that complements the Beaux-Arts Apartments. On top of that are two stories within its mansard roof. Within both floors under the mansard roof, the 14th and 15th, are twenty-nine apartments. The façade consists of striped granite slabs horizontally placed, which alternated with light and dark granite (bands of pink and green granite) with windows of the same green reflective glass used for Towers I and II.

Three UN Plaza's northern, front entrance.

The granite slabs were cut to varying thicknesses to complement the alternating bands of brick-and-glass on the Beaux-Arts Apartments. Three UN Plaza is separated from the Beaux-Arts via a one-hundred-foot-wide courtyard which is lined with columns. The courtyard is entered beneath a skylight-capped double colonnade. Roche ensured that people would not mistake this building for another architect by framing the windows and cladding the roof with a pale greenish-blue metal to complement One and Two UN Plaza across the street. A twenty-foot high colonnade runs the full length of the site and knits the park and base of the building together. Tables, chairs, benches, trees, a stone wall and waterfall provide a quiet, relaxing atmosphere in Midtown Manhattan. Goldberger had stated that Roche was now reverting to basic architecture, or backward-architecting, in that his use of metal and glass on Towers I and II. Roche countered by saying that new developments in granite and stone had made it possible to consider that the cost was lower than metal and glass and was merely adapting to the times. The property includes approximately 205,000 square feet of office space, with an adjacent public plaza of approximately 5,000 square feet. Three UN Plaza is leased exclusively to UNICEF as its world headquarters.

== History of Turtle Bay ==
Turtle Bay was referred to as Turtle Bay Farm by early settlers. The farm was adjacent to the East River and by the mid-eighteenth century, Turtle Bay Farm extended from about 40th to 49th Street and from Third Avenue to the East River. The farm was named after a cove in Turtle Bay. The cove was given its name from the abundance of turtles in the slow-moving brackish water found along the East River. The cove was located off the East River from about 45th to 48th Streets. Turtle Cove was fed by a small stream that originated at approximately Second Avenue and 48th Street. There was such an abundance of turtles in the cove that residents held a "turtle feast.". Filled in for development purposes, the cove is now covered by the gardens of the northern (northeastern half along the East River) border of the United Nations grounds. Eventually, Turtle Bay Farm was replaced by homes (along the northwestern half of Turtle Bay), riverfront industry, and shantytowns beginning from the mid-18th century. Historical records of the "Turtle Bay Gardens Historic District" which is a two-block area along the northwestern half of Turtle Bay (from East 48th to E. 49th Street, between Second and Third Avenues), describe the twenty homes that were built there. Notable people who have lived there include Katharine Hepburn (#244 E. 49th St.), Stephen Sondheim (#246 E. 49th St.), and Tyrone Power. However, these historical records also describe the not-so-notables of Turtle Bay. The outliers who lived there called it "Blood Alley," as the once pristine Turtle Bay Farm and Turtle Cove had become slaughterhouses for their proximity to the cove and river. After renovations in the 1920s, the area underwent a rapid building period, and the cove was filled in.

== Land acquisition ==
During the 1940s, a real estate developer named William Zeckendorf began actively buying properties in Turtle Bay to construct or develop Turtle Bay. However, Zeckendorf was unsure as to what type of development he would be allowed to build by New York City's Planning Commission or New York's City Council. For that reason, he coined the term, "X City" since he had literally no idea what to build. Both the Planning Commission and New York's City Council are the two powerful organizations that determine the future of building sites in New York City as part of New York's home-rule designation for municipalities. Both are required for a new building, which then needs approval from the at-the-time Board of Estimate, all as important as the mayor's approval, the governor of New York State and New York State's legislature. But it wasn't until 1946 – after World War II – that a 6-square city block and the slaughterhouse area were razed. Then the Third Avenue el train closed in 1955, which was the last of Manhattan's el trains, and the 16-acre area known as Turtle Bay or X City was destined to become the UN Plaza, headquartered at the UN Secretariat, its UN General Assembly and associated buildings.

John D. Rockefeller Jr. reached out to Zeckendorf. He proposed a lump sum cash offer of $8.5 million to Zeckendorf, who leaped at the opportunity. After a round of last-minute negotiations, Rockefeller then gifted it to the UN after "eleventh-hour negotiations" which enabled New York to win the bid over a consortium of local New York businessmen and the cities of Boston, Philadelphia, and San Francisco, who were all leading contenders for the UN site at that time. The bid — negotiated by Zeckendorf between the Rockefellers and Mayor William O'Dwyer of New York City — was won. The group of New York businessmen (including Zeckendorf), who once planned the Turtle Bay site for their "private development," lost after Rockefeller announced he would "give to the city of New York the land as a gift." Mayor O'Dwyer gratefully accepted the gift from the Rockefellers and New York City became the future home of the UN. The Ford Foundation followed and contributed $ 6.2 million for the Dag Hammarskjold Library to be built along the southern border of the proposed UN site, as well as $6.5 million for a school chartered by the UN. Thus, the "Turtle Bay" area of land — from 42nd to 46th Streets, from the East River to 2nd Avenue — was destined to become the "Capital of the World."

Zeckendorf would later develop Roosevelt Field Shopping Center in the center of Nassau County, which is today still the largest shopping mall on Long Island. The exit M2 off of the Meadowbrook State Parkway in East Garden City and Uniondale, Long Island continues as Zeckendorf Boulevard in his honor. The boulevard serves as the access point to the shopping mall from the parkway.

=== Planning ===
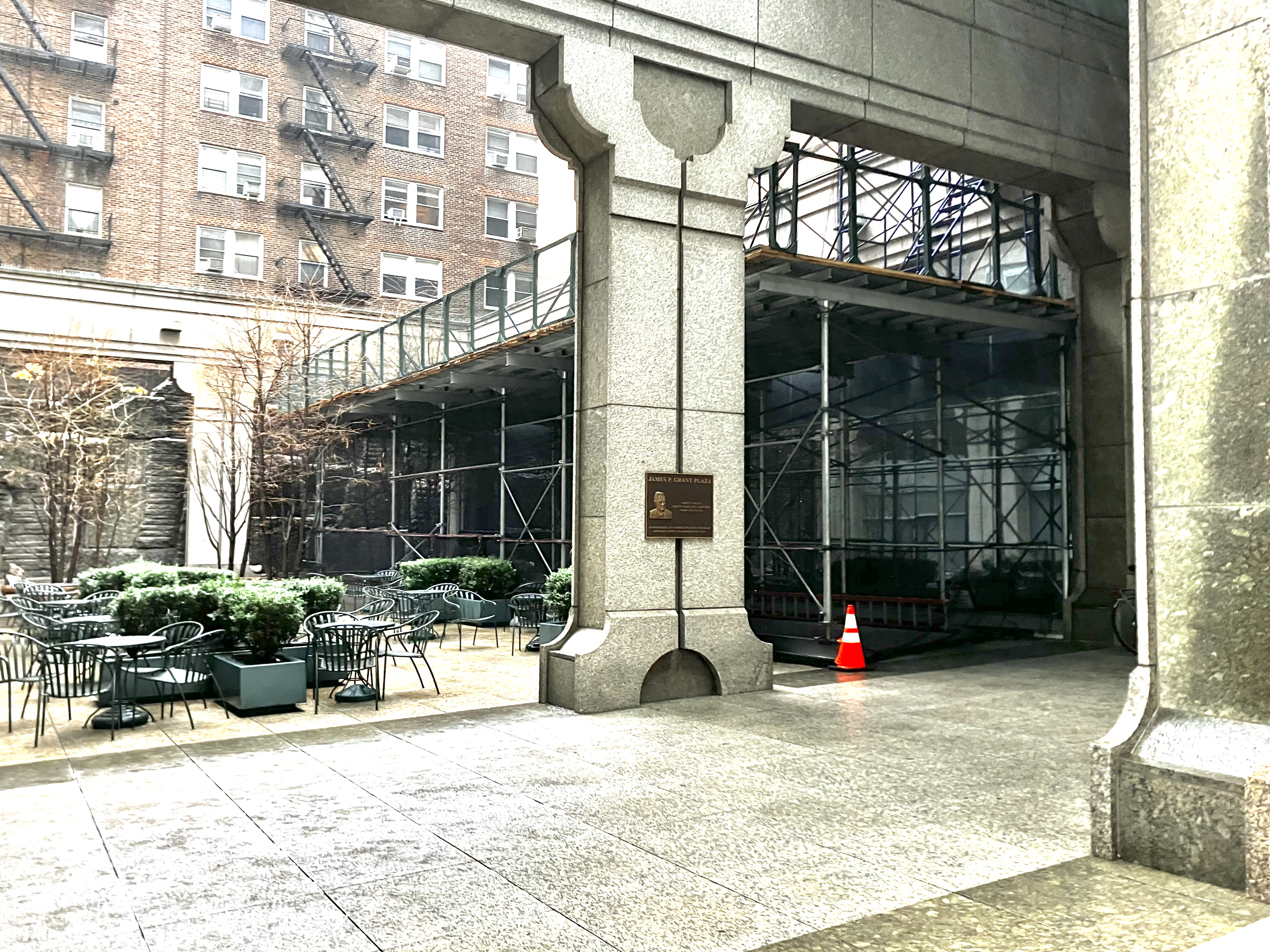
James P. Grant Plaza — Courtyard of Three United Nations Plaza.

After Roche's partner John Dinkeloo died, he undertook the last stage of the UN enclave buildings alone. The glass curtain wall of Towers One and Two are gone, along with the abstract shapes. Tower 3 is not at all, but 15 stories tall and made of granite, with a row of columns at its base, rectangular windows in its midsection, and a mansard roof at its top. "If 1 and 2 United Nations Plaza epitomized the utter sleekness of late modernism, 3 United Nations Plaza is the sort of building that cannot but be described by the term post-modern: it looks something like older buildings, it has ornamentation, and it has been designed to blend with rather than to stand aloof from its surroundings." Some have questioned whether Roche went the more traditional route, and chose not to exploit "the dramatic possibilities in any urban setting." Roche recognized that there "was a point beyond which the abstraction of the first two buildings that should not be pushed."

Goldberger has said that 1 and 2 United Nations Plaza towers are "arguably the best glass buildings in Manhattan since the Seagram Building, and their utterly cool, self-assured abstraction set the tone for a generation of late-modern towers" and "should have his own identity."

== Critical reception ==
"If 1 and 2 United Nations Plaza epitomized the utter sleekness of late modernism, 3 United Nations Plaza is the sort of building that cannot but be described by the term post-modern: it looks something like older buildings, it has ornamentation, and it has been designed to blend with rather than to stand aloof from its surroundings," wrote Goldberger in 1987 when it opened. Goldberger was pleased with 3 United Nations Plaza, which is the third building in his trio of United Nations Plaza structures, but unlike the first two, "which are sleek abstractions of glass, this new one is a building that blends comfortably into its surroundings."

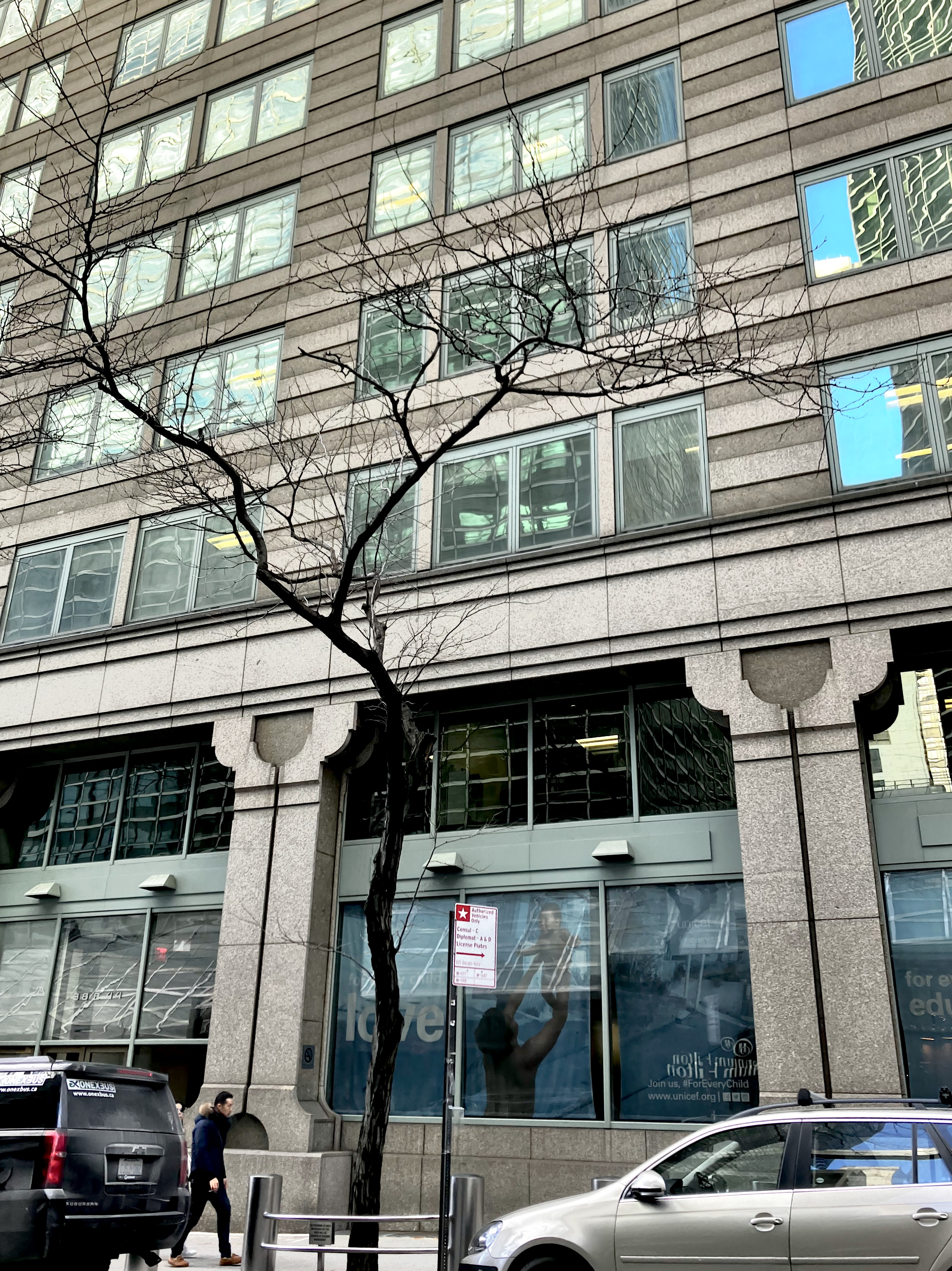
Front view of Three United Nations Plaza from across the street at Two United Nations Plaza.

Tower 3 is a graceful building that is integrated well with the streetscape of the south side of East 44th Street without directly imitating any of the buildings beside it. Tower 3 pays particular homage to the Beaux-Arts Apartments next door, the Art Moderne complex of 1930 by Kenneth Murchison and Robert Hood of Hood, Godley & Fouilhoux that is patterned in horizontal stripes of light and dark brown brick. Roche has mimicked this by applying horizontal stripes of light and dark granite. The light-colored stone is set slightly in front of the darker granite, giving the building a richer texture and making it look 3-dimensional.

The windows are framed in metal that has been painted a pale greenish-blue color, tying the building further to the tone of the glass of its predecessors across the street, and the two-story mansard section (which contains 29 small apartments for United Nations personnel) is sheathed in aluminum of the same color. There is a small plaza in what would otherwise be a vacant lot to the west of the new building, between it and the Beaux-Arts apartments. It is difficult to evaluate the plaza at this point since its furniture and plantings have not yet been fully installed. But the decision to extend the row of columns at the building's base off to the side of the tower to become a kind of formal gateway into the plaza is superb -this colonnade partially encloses the plaza and makes it a true outdoor room, not simply a leftover space off the sidewalk. The columns are "almost cartoonlike," states Goldberger, who describes the columns further as, "Pieces of granite forming a thin, abstracted version of a classical column have been attached to an inner shaft.

UN Plaza Buildings

"They belong to another moment in time, another sculpture, another kind of composition."

— Kevin Roche, 1985

== See also ==
- Architecture of New York City
- One United Nations Plaza
- Two United Nations Plaza
- Beaux-Arts Apartments
