= United Nations Development Corporation =

New York State public benefit corporation overview
- Formed: 1968
- Jurisdiction: Real estate within a defined area in the vicinity of U.N. headquarters in Manhattan
- Headquarters: Two United Nations Plaza; 27th Floor; New York, NY 10017
- New York State public benefit corporation executive: Robert Cole, Executive Vice President & General Counsel
- Website: www.undc.org

The United Nations Development Corporation (UNDC) is a public-benefit corporation in the U.S. state of New York that helps the United Nations with its real estate, office space, and development needs. It was created in 1968. The UNDC is permitted to develop and operate real estate only within a prescribed area (the "Development District") in the vicinity of the United Nations headquarters in Manhattan. The boundaries of the Development District and other powers of the Corporation are subject to change to the extent provided by additional legislation.

== Organization ==
The UNDC has a 14-member board of directors. Its management team is headed by Executive Vice President and General Counsel Robert Cole, who reports to the board. In 2017, the UNDC had operating expenses of $28.05 million, an outstanding debt of $70.11 million, and a level of staffing of 12 people.

== Facilities ==
The UNDC has assisted in developing One UN Plaza, Two UN Plaza, and Three UN Plaza. Three UN Plaza is leased to UNICEF as its world headquarters.

== See also ==
- Albany Convention Center Authority
- Development Authority of the North Country
- Empire State Development Corporation
- Hudson River Park Trust
- Hugh L. Carey Battery Park City Authority
- New York Convention Center Operating Corporation
- Lower Manhattan Development Corporation
- Municipal Assistance Corporation for the City of NY
- Olympic Regional Development Authority
- State University Construction Fund
