= Daniel Brodsky =

American real estate developer (born 1944)

- Born: 1944 (age 81–82)
- Education: University of Pennsylvania (BA); New York University (MA)
- Occupation: Real Estate Developer
- Known for: Chairman, The Metropolitan Museum of Art; CEO, The Brodsky Organization
- Spouse: Estrellita Brodsky
- Children: 3

Daniel Brodsky (born 1944) is an American real estate developer, art collector, and member of the board at The Metropolitan Museum of Art, where he served as chairman from 2011–2021.

== Biography ==
Daniel Brodsky was born in 1944. His mother Shirley (née Markowitz) was a painter and his father, Nathan Brodsky, was a real estate developer. He has one sister Thea Brodsky Amro. He earned a B.A. in political science from the University of Pennsylvania in 1968 and an M.A. in urban planning from the Robert F. Wagner Graduate School of Public Service at New York University in 1970. In 1971, he joined the real estate development and management firm founded by his father. In 1981, the firm was renamed The Brodsky Organization. In 2006, his father died and Daniel became the CEO of The Brodsky Organization. The Brodsky Organization has developed over 8,000 apartments in New York City, and is one of the largest developers of middle class housing in the city.

== Philanthropy and board memberships ==
Brodsky has served the boards of the American Museum of Natural History and the Municipal Art Society and is currently a trustee of the New York City Ballet. In 2011, he was elected Chairman of The Metropolitan Museum of Art where he had previously served on its Real Estate Council (1984), as a trustee of the museum, and vice chairman of the Buildings Committee. He established the Brodsky Family Fellowship at New York University’s Robert F. Wagner Graduate School of Public Service which provides scholarships for students studying in the areas of urban economic development, housing policy, and affordable housing.

He is a member of the Real Estate Board of New York.

In 2012, following the appointment at The Met, the by-laws of the museum were formally amended to recognize the office of the chairman as having authority over the assignment and review of both the offices of president and director of the museum. The office of chairman was first introduced relatively late in the museum's history in the 1960s in contemplation of the anticipated donation of the Lehman collection to the museum and has since that time, under Brodsky, become the most senior administrative position at the museum. Brodsky's term as Chairman of The Metropolitan Museum of Art ended in January 2021.

== Personal life ==
He is married to art historian and philanthropist Estrellita Brodsky, the daughter of immigrants from Venezuela and Uruguay. Mrs. Brodsky was named one of the Top 200 Collectors by ArtNews Magazine for 2017 and 2018. They have three children, Katherine, Alexander, and Thomas. Most of the family are alumni of NYU with his wife obtaining a PhD from New York University Institute of Fine Arts in 2009; his daughter a J.D. in 2006; and his son, Alexander, a B.S. from the Steinhardt School of Culture, Education, and Human Development in 2001. His sons Alexander and Thomas and his nephew, J. Dean Amro, all hold senior positions at The Brodsky Organization.
