= Two United Nations Plaza =

Hotel in Manhattan, New York

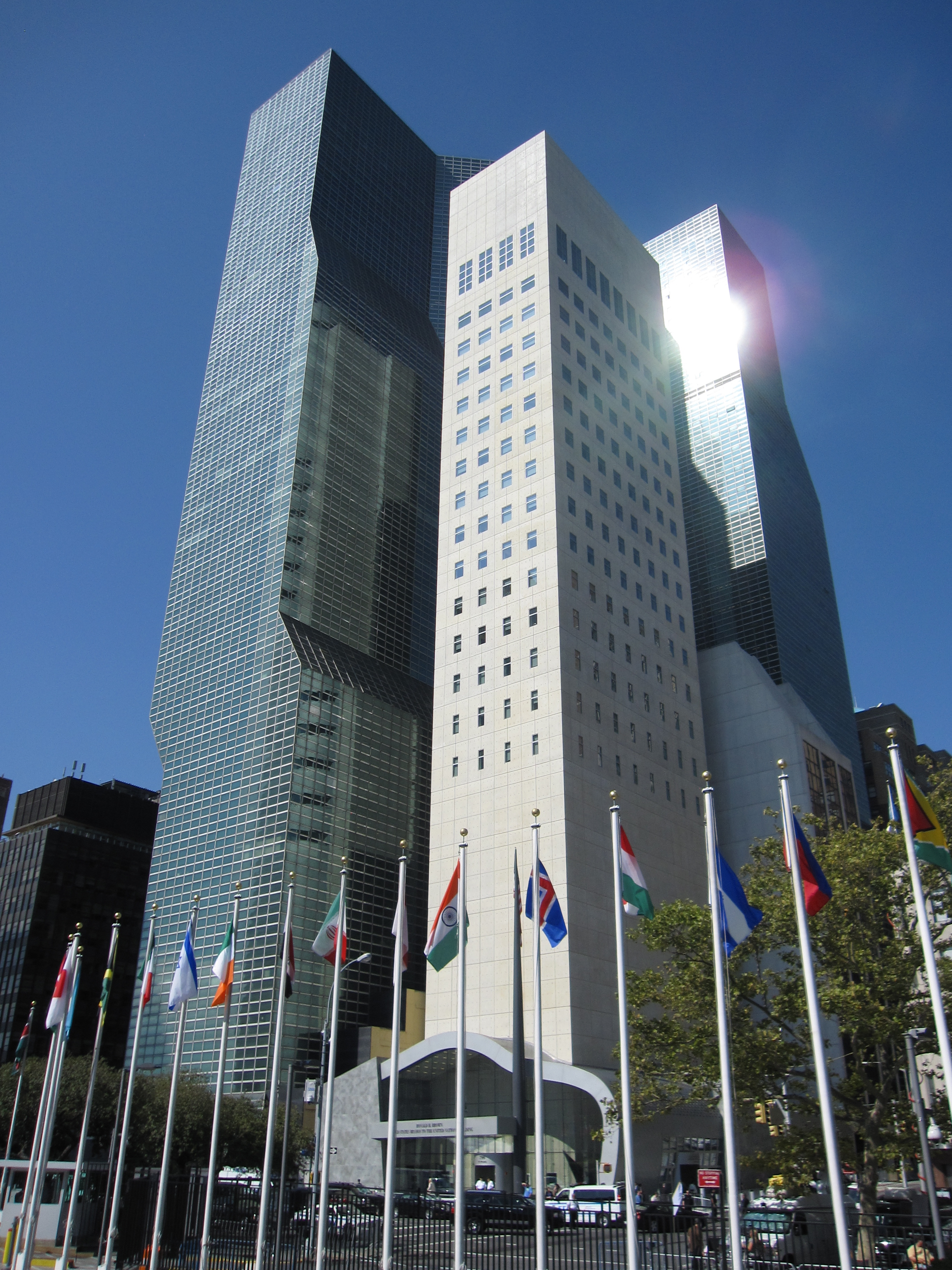
- Two United Nations Plaza (right) viewed southwest from UN Plaza Street (One United Nations Plaza is on left). The beige building between UN Plaza 1 and 2 is the US Mission to the UN.
- Former names: United Nations Plaza Hotel, Millennium UN Plaza
- Hotel chain: Hilton Hotels

General information
- Type: Hotel/office
- Architectural style: Modern
- Location: 1, 2, & 3 United Nations Plaza, Manhattan, New York City, United States
- Coordinates: 40°45′03″N 73°58′11″W
- Current tenants: Millennium Hilton New York One UN Plaza and UNDC tenants
- Completed: 1983; 43 years ago
- Cost: $69.5 million
- Owner: UNDC and Millennium & Copthorne Hotels
- Landlord: UNDC & Millennium & Copthorne Hotels

Height
- Height: 496 ft (151 m)—505 ft (154 m)
- Architectural: Modern architecture

Technical details
- Material: steel (frame)
- Floor count: 44 (Note: The hotel occupies floors 27–39 in both One and Two United Nations Plaza; both buildings have 44 stories.)

Design and construction
- Architects: Kevin Roche & John Dinkeloo
- Architecture firm: Roche-Dinkeloo

Other information
- Number of rooms: 439
- Facilities: Ambassador Grill; Millennium Health and Racquet Club

Website
- undc.org

New York City Landmark
- Designated: January 17, 2017
- Reference no.: 2588
- Designated entity: Interior: lobby and Ambassador Grill

Two United Nations Plaza is a mixed-use building in Turtle Bay, Manhattan that was designed for the United Nations by Kevin Roche & John Dinkeloo.

== Description ==
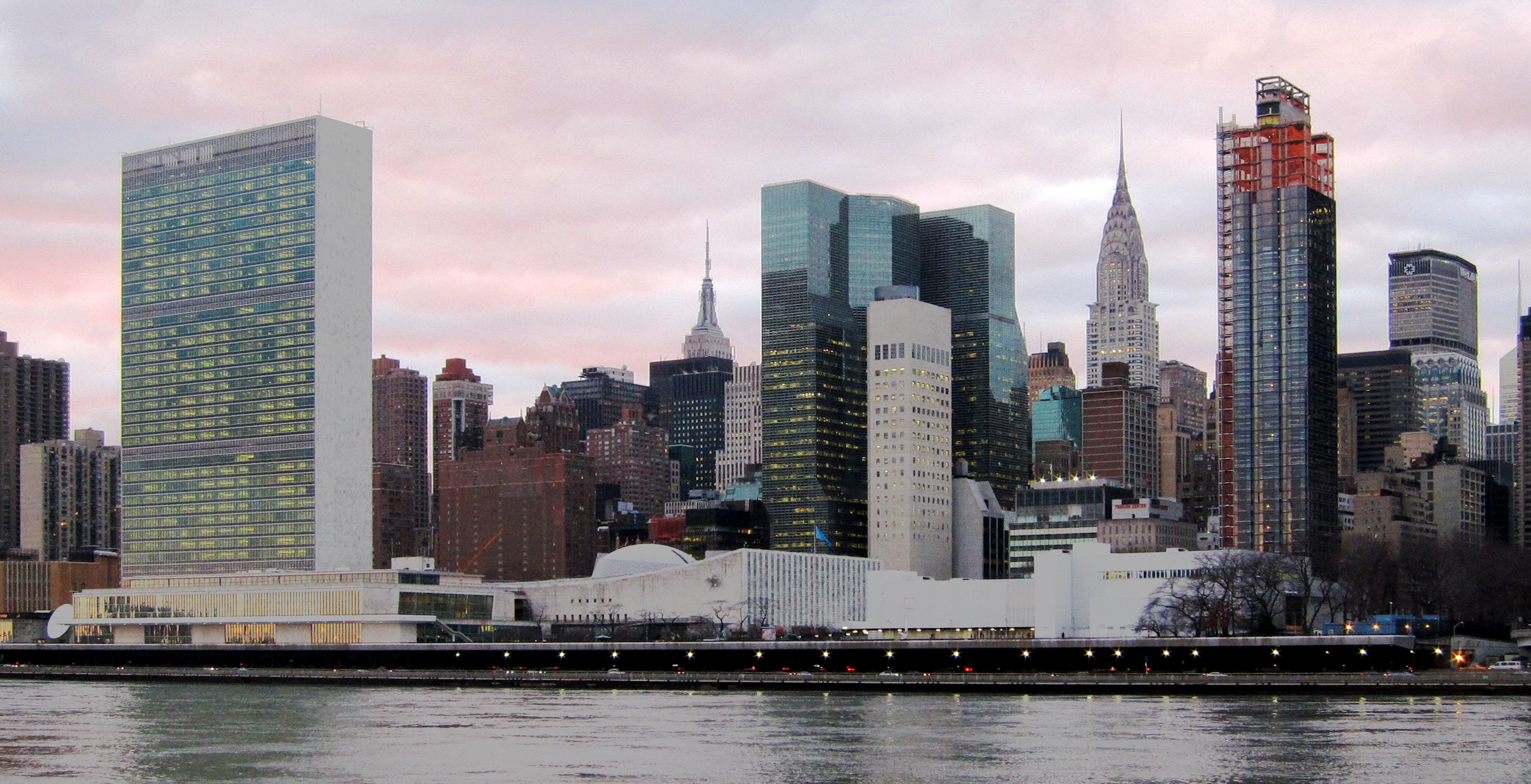
One and Two United Nations Plaza in center, dwarfing the US Mission to the UN, viewed from Roosevelt Island. UN Secretariat is on the left.

Two UN Plaza is located across First Avenue from the UN headquarters in Midtown Manhattan of New York City. Two UN Plaza is situated on the north side of 44th Street adjacent to and west of One UN Plaza. The United Nations Development Corporation or UNDC is a quasi-public institution that developed and presently operates all three buildings. UNDC operates and maintains the office space at Two UN Plaza. The hotel, which occupies both One and Two UN Plaza, is operated by the Millennium Hotel Group and is known as the Millennium Hilton New York One UN Plaza. The hotel/office complex was built in stages due to public outcry and lack of funding. Due to a general economic recession and community opposition in the late 60s and early 70s, the large-scale plans for an office/hotel complex and conference space were tabled. Thus, One UN Plaza was built first in 1976. Two UN Plaza followed this in 1983. As the name suggests, UNDC's principal tenants are the United Nations, the UN Development Programme, and other missions to the UN. The Millennium Hilton New York One UN Plaza is a privately owned hotel and occupies the lobby, the upper floors, the swimming pool, and the tennis/racquetball courts.

Two UN Plaza (also referred to as Tower Two, D.C. 2, or simply, "Two") opened in 1983 and is a 40-story mixed-use office building and hotel located between 44th and 45th Streets west of, and adjacent to One UN Plaza. The building includes 450,000 square feet of office space on floors 2 through 28, hotel space on floors 29 through 40, and separate ground floor office and hotel lobbies.

Two UN Plaza is registered with the City of New York as "783–793 First Avenue and 335–343 East 44th Street, and 323–333 East 44th Street and 322–334 East 45th Street, and is a landmark status building, known as Landmark Site of the Borough of Manhattan, Tax Map Block 1337, Lots 14 and 7502." Two UN Plaza was built in modern architectural design.

Two UN Plaza is located on the east side of Midtown Manhattan along the East River in an area of Manhattan known as Turtle Bay. Two UN Plaza is adjacent to one of the most important buildings in the world: the United Nations. Two UN Plaza is located in the most important part of Manhattan.

Location

"If Manhattan is the center of the City, midtown is the center of the center."

— AIA Guide to NYC, p. 204

If Manhattan is the center of the city (of all five boroughs), then Midtown Manhattan is the center of the hub. "Here are most of the elements one expects to find in a city core: the major railroad and bus stations, the vast majority of hotel rooms, the biggest stores, the main public library and post office. All are located in Turtle Bay."

=== Architecture ===
Roche-Dinkeloo planned Two United Nations Plaza as a modern art building. It mirrors One UN Plaza in design. It has a 505-foot-tall slab and 360,000 feet of office space on the first 26 floors and a 292-room hotel on the top thirteen floors. At 505 feet in height, the building is three feet shorter than the UN Secretariat, in line with zoning restrictions for the district.

==== Construction ====
UN Plaza buildings

"They belong to another moment in time, another sculpture, another kind of composition."

— Kevin Roche, 1985

== Design and construction ==
Two UN Plaza was designed and built from 1979–1983. KRJDA's project number was 7910, and was known as Phase II of the UNDC's plan for UN enclave expansion with 420,000 square footage. The $69.5 million UN Tower 2 was financed by a $75 million loan from Chemical Bank of New York and refinanced with $75 million in commercial paper. It was expected to run 3 percent over the initial cost estimate. Due to increased demand by the UN delegation after One UN Plaza was built, the combined office/hotel building needed another companion building due to the unanticipated commercial and financial success of Tower One. A few years after One was built, the long-anticipated building was finished in 1983 just west of Tower One. Though not a part of the original design, it was both commissioned by UNDC and designed by Roche-Dinkeloo as a 40-story "sister" building to One UN Plaza, "poured from the same mold." Andrea Dean stated it was "of a different design from the original plan but following the same formula as that of the [Tower One]." Both buildings are 44 stories high with offices on the lower floors and residential space above; the new tower has 115 rental apartments plus five suites, while the hotel has 289 guest rooms. Two UN Plaza is situated perpendicular to 44th Street and separated from One UN Plaza by thirty feet.

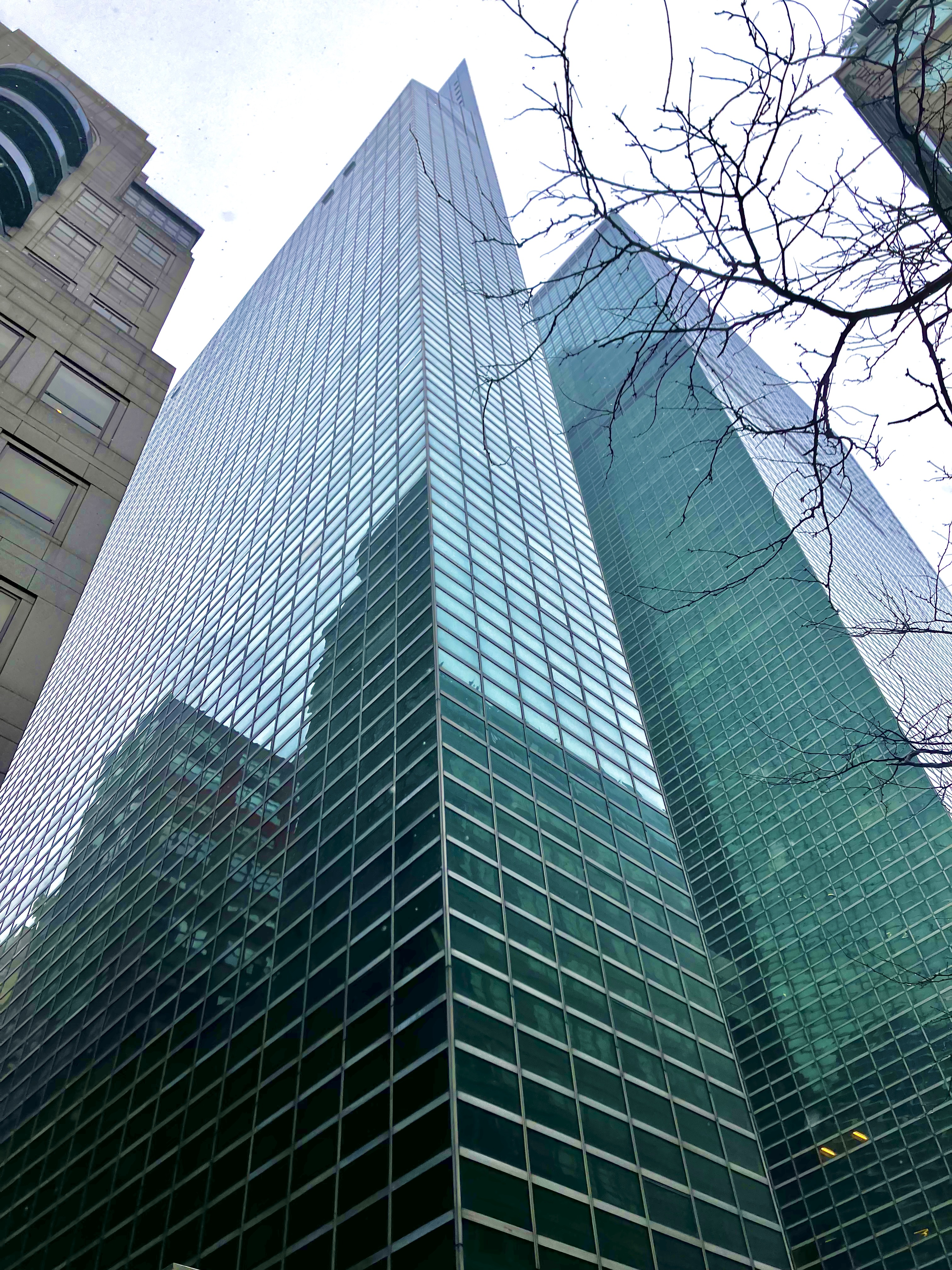
Two United Nations Plaza on the left, One United Nations Plaza on the right, viewed from James P. Grant Plaza across the street at Three United Nations Plaza (UNICEF)

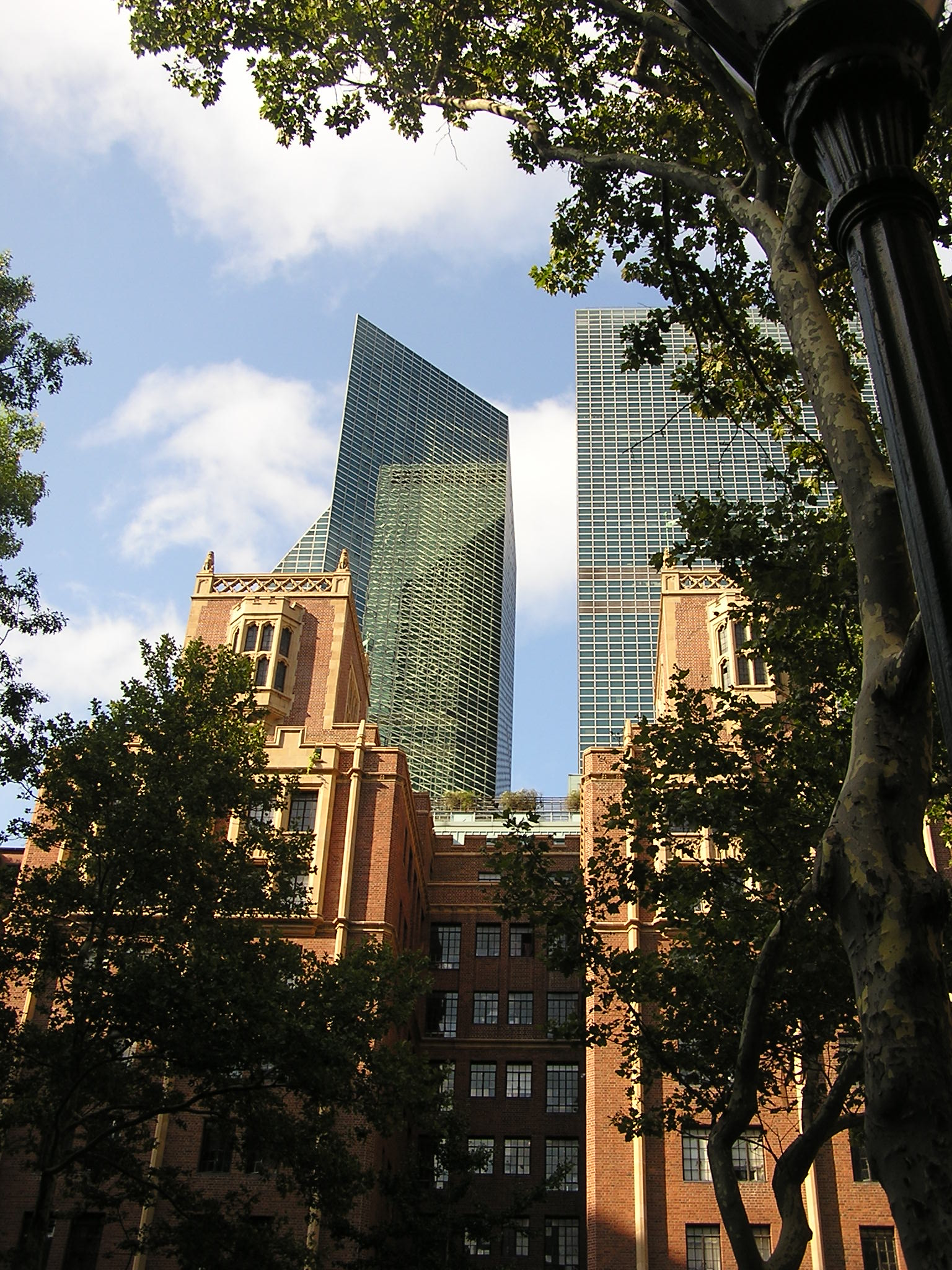
Tower Two's large chamfer on the southeast corner and its western setback, viewed from Tudor City (to the south)

There is a large chamfer seen on the southeast corner of the building, with a sloping setback, and blue-green glass wrapping 26-stories of office space and thirteen stories of luxury apartments for UN delegation employees. A lobby and two bridges join the towers. Bridges are connecting both One and Two on the third and eleventh floors.

=== Planning ===
As originally planned, the UN's project was to be a two-block complex for office, hotel, and conference space funded by the City of New York and New York State, developed by the UNDC. However, due to the economic recession and resistance from the Turtle Bay community and Tudor city residents, the large-scale project was abandoned in the early 1970s. Only the hotel at the corner of 44th and First Avenue was built. As Roche recalled, it was "really a leftover piece." The building was designed to "complement the adjacent glass-walled structure" which opened in 1975 ― Tower One on 44th Street ― and was projected to cost $50 million.

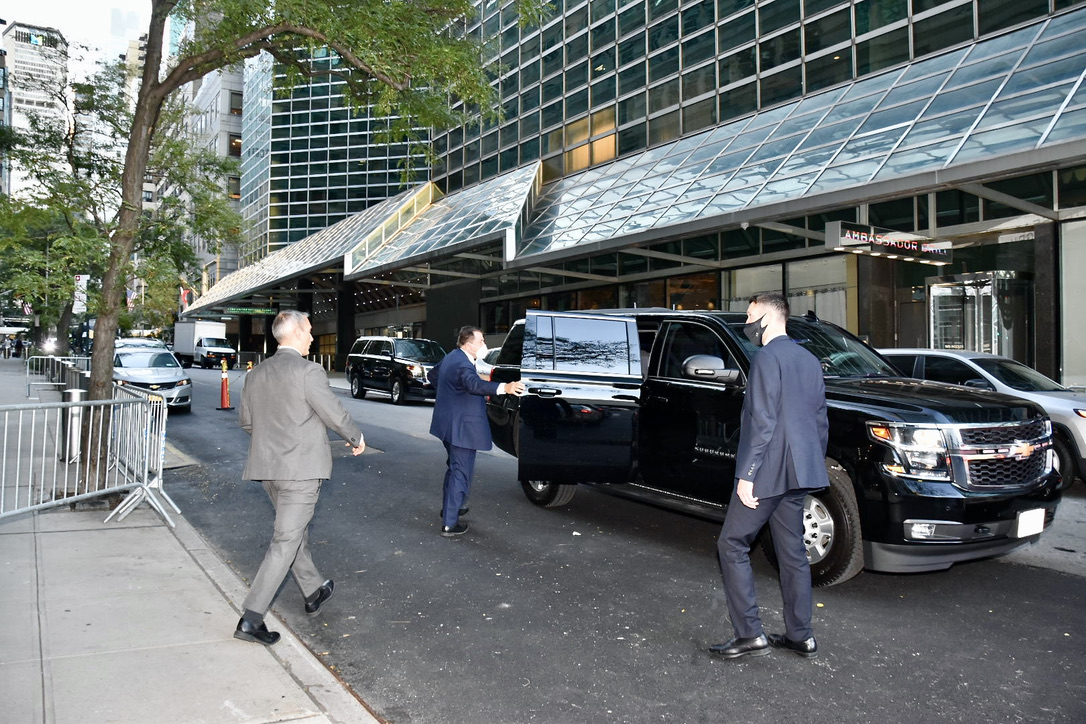
East 44th Street hotel lobby entrance. Note sharp chamfer on southeast face of Tower Two, and shed-style canopy or porte-cochere providing shelter from rain.

After Tower One was completed and operated successfully, the adjacent property became available. The thirty-thousand-square-foot property was owned by the Bishop family, who granted Litwin & Swarzman Developers a 99-year lease. Subsequently, the UNDC purchased the land from Litwin & Swarzman after successfully litigating the property. The decision to proceed with a second building of a different design from the original plan followed with "the same formula as that of the hotel," approximating but not challenging the older structure." To harmonize with the surrounding buildings and Tower One, Roche made use of similar sloping setbacks on the northern face, next to Uganda's mission to the UN, and the western face, "and maintained the innovative angling of blue-green glass which distinguished 1 UN Plaza." A deep chamfer is seen on the southeast corner of the tower. According to Dean, the building was planned to extend to 45th Street. Both towers have a tight, gridded facade "without window expression" — the grids do not conform to respective floors. Both towers are linked at street level with a wrap-around, shed-style canopy or porte-cochère — which is made to look like a continuation of the curtain wall above. Thus, the porte-cochère affords hotel guests and cars protection from the elements,

providing a shelter at the street level with an overhead glass apron that appears to form a continuous glass curtain wall. Both towers have cants or chamfers to make the transition between the larger office floors and the smaller hotel or residential ones. Most striking is the sharp chamfer Roche put on the southeast face of Tower Two. By doing this, Roche gave views of the river and street instead of peering into neighboring offices or residential kitchens, since only 30 feet separates the two buildings. "It is these carefully calculated angles and shifts in elevational directions and dimension that create constantly changing sculptural relationships between the two buildings as you move around them and allow the shapes of the second to play off the first to enliven the forms of both structures."

Two UN Plaza viewed southeast from the northwest

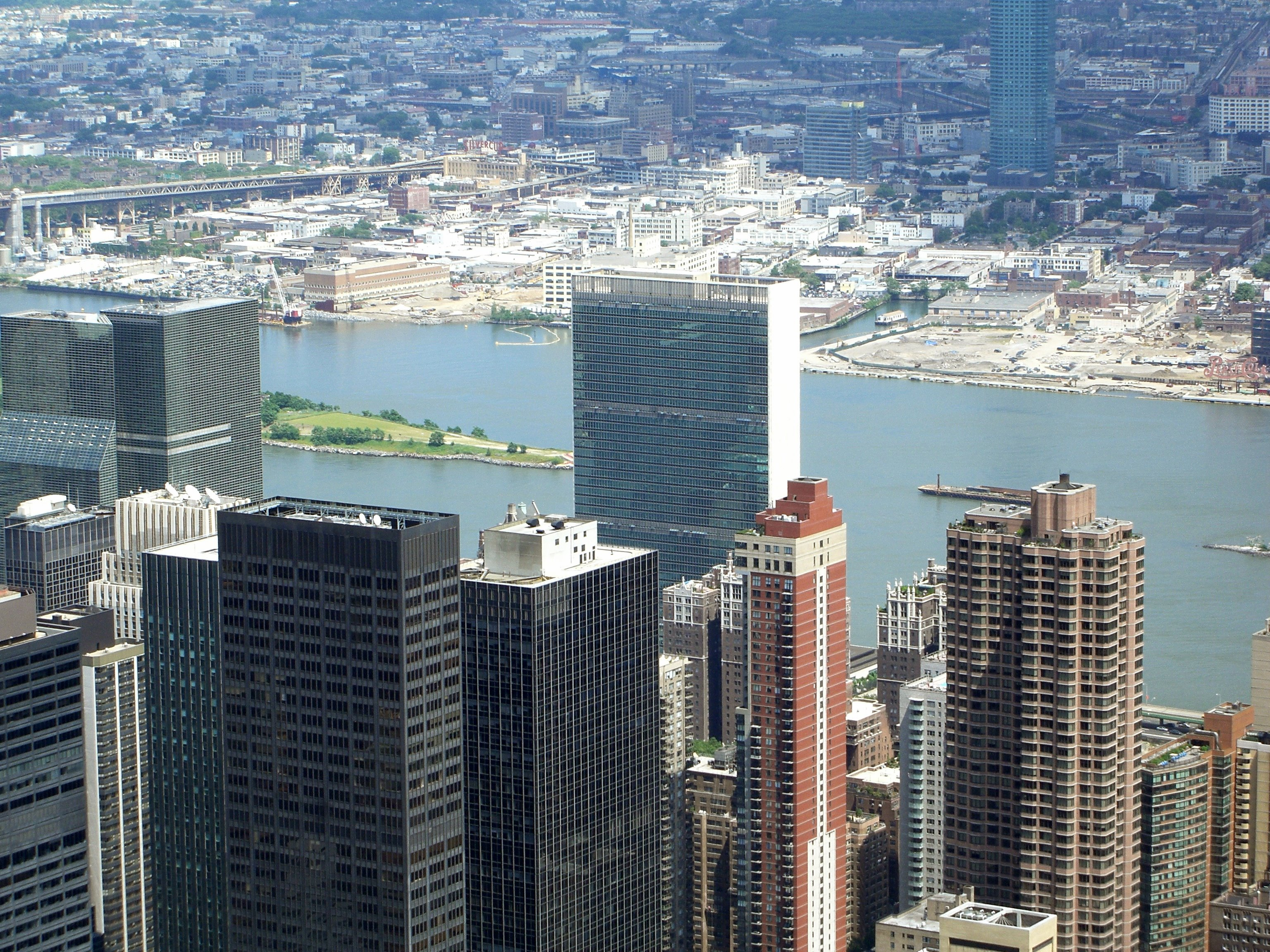
On the far left of this picture are Tower 2 (l) and Tower 1 (r) viewed northeast, showing Tower Two's western and southeastern setbacks (UN Secretariat in the middle).

The estimated cost initially was slated to be $50 million, through corporation bonds, and turned over to the city as was accomplished with One UN Plaza, for which over $1 million in rentals would be realized upon completion. It was estimated that an additional 350,000 square feet of total space would be realised with the new building, of which 225,000 would be for hotel use.

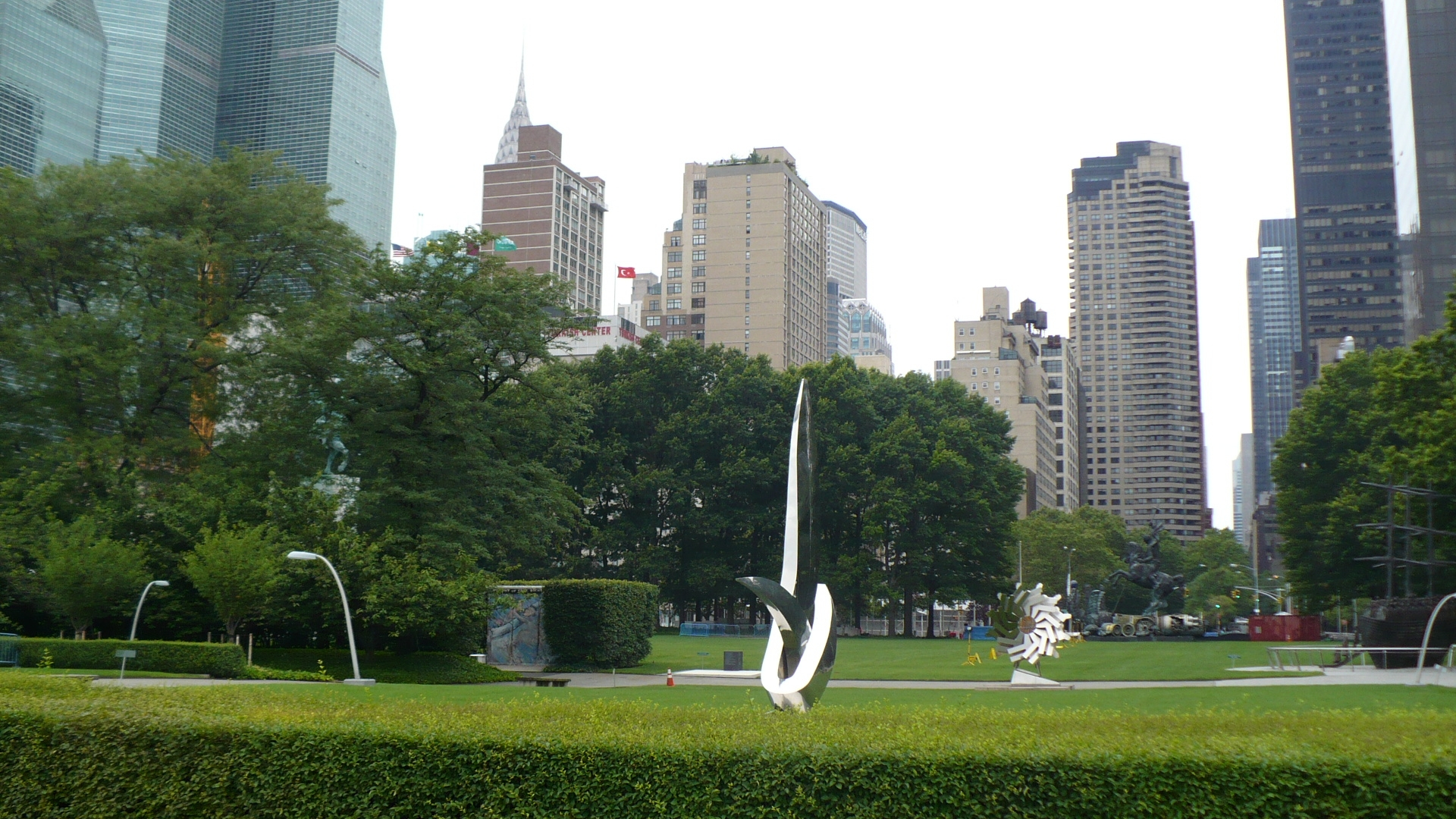
View southwest from the North Gardens of the UN enclave, photo taken by the "Roots and Ties for Peace," a gift from the Brazilian government. Tower Two's western setback is well-outlined.

Having been successful with earlier attempts to block construction of the earlier massive proposals, only minimal resistance was given by the neighborhood, who primarily voiced complaints of blockage of sunlight. Since the unoccupied building that existed on the site just north of One UN Plaza by the Bishop family was finally available, purchased, and litigated and obtained for use for the site, the plans finally went forward for constructing Tower Two. One UN Hotel's original lobby was T-shaped and significantly smaller than the updated lobby. The new lobby incorporates part of the old lobby (where it was located in 1 UN Plaza and the east elevators), and joins the steps to the Ambassador Grill.

Tower One and Tower Two stand side by side on East 44th Street and are separated by exactly 30 feet to conform to New York's building and zoning regulations, but are connected by a lobby walkthrough and skywalks at the 3rd and 11th floors between the office areas. Both towers are owned by the city and leased on a long-term basis to the UNDC. Two UN Plaza cost $69.5 million and was financed by a $75 million loan from Chemical Bank and refinanced with a "sale of $75 million in commercial paper." It was expected to run 3 percent over the initial cost estimate as planned. New York City benefits as well. Although the nonprofit corporation pays no real-estate tax, a provision of the agreement signed by UNDC and New York City increases the city's share of the surplus as the surplus grows. The surplus amounted to $3.5 million in 1981 and $2.3 million in 1982.

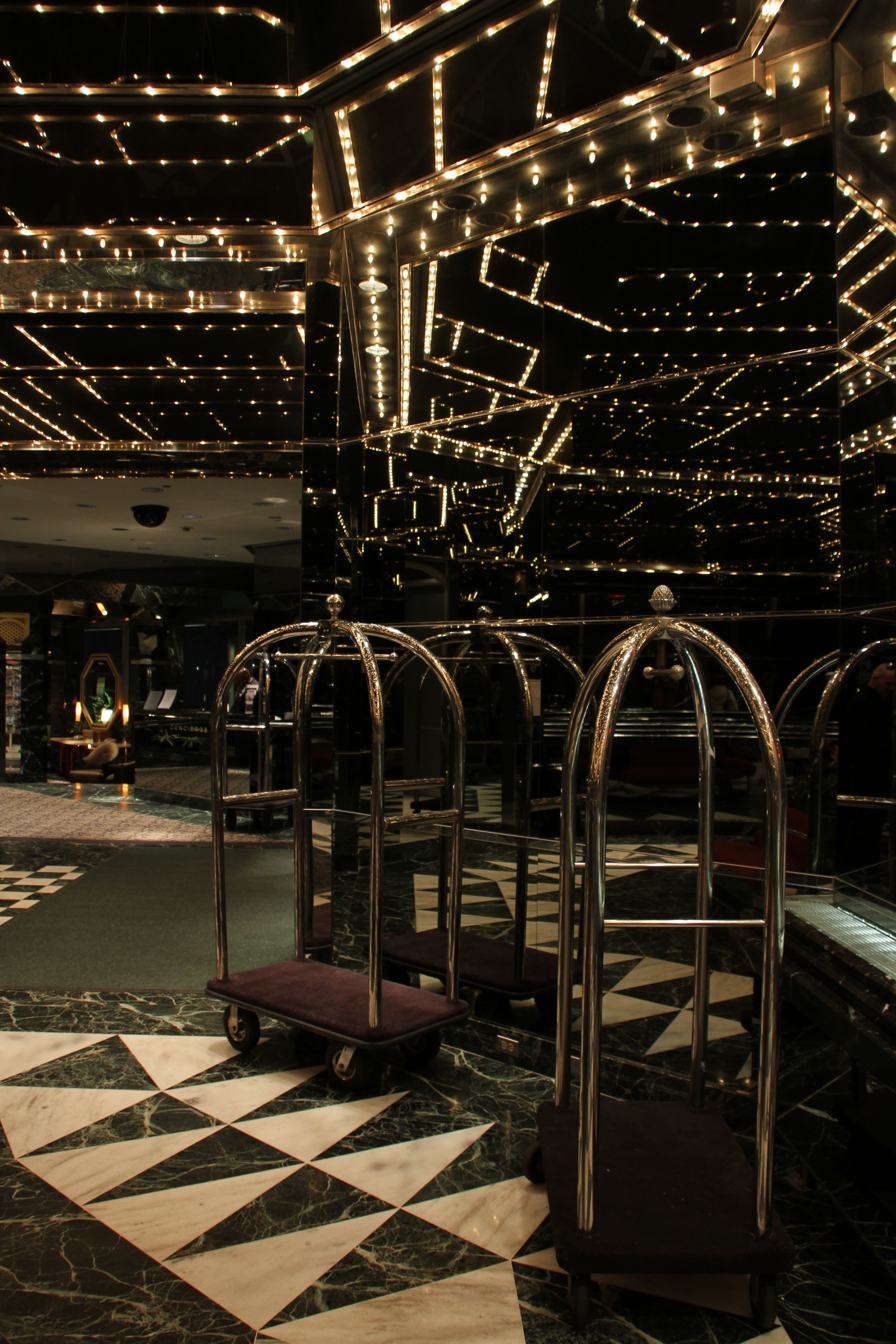
Today's lobby joining both One and Two UN Plaza

"By skillfully relating two simple geometric shapes, each fairly mute in itself, Kevin Roche has here forged a complex, eloquent work of art." Tower Two is multi-sided, but not "bizarre and attention-getting." According to Goldberger, it "reads as an abstraction, thanks to the skin of blue-green glass that covers it like a blanket, obscuring any sense of floor divisions or even of conventional windows, and its sharp-edged form plays off against the earlier tower beside it in such a way as to deepen and enrich both buildings." Like Tower One, the glass mullions do not coincide to the floor levels. "This is a building that breaks many rules – it relates in no obvious way to its surroundings, except, of course, to its neighboring tower and in a more distant way to the UN Secretariat Building. And in its unrelenting abstraction it eschews many of the details of a conventional building. Part of the reason it works well is that "Roche is an architect of uncommon lyricism in glass; he is able to surmount the mute quality of so much abstract architecture and turn abstraction into something graceful and articulate."

The scrutiny placed on Roche-Dinkeloo was favorable. "The buildings are literally, as well as figuratively, inviting. The new tower extends the entry canopy of the original United Nations Plaza tower, which looked like a piece of the glass skin peeled off to cover the sidewalk, and expands it into a large porte-cochere between the two towers. The theme of light and reflected light is used everywhere, but always with restraint – it is not easy to make an architecture of mirrors that does not seem excessive, but Mr. Roche has managed to do so; this is modernism at its most sensual."

==== Interior features ====
First, and perhaps the most striking element of Two UN Plaza, is that the lobby is similar to Tower One, allowing for mirrored octagonal columns and skylights on the ceilings to bounce light in many directions.

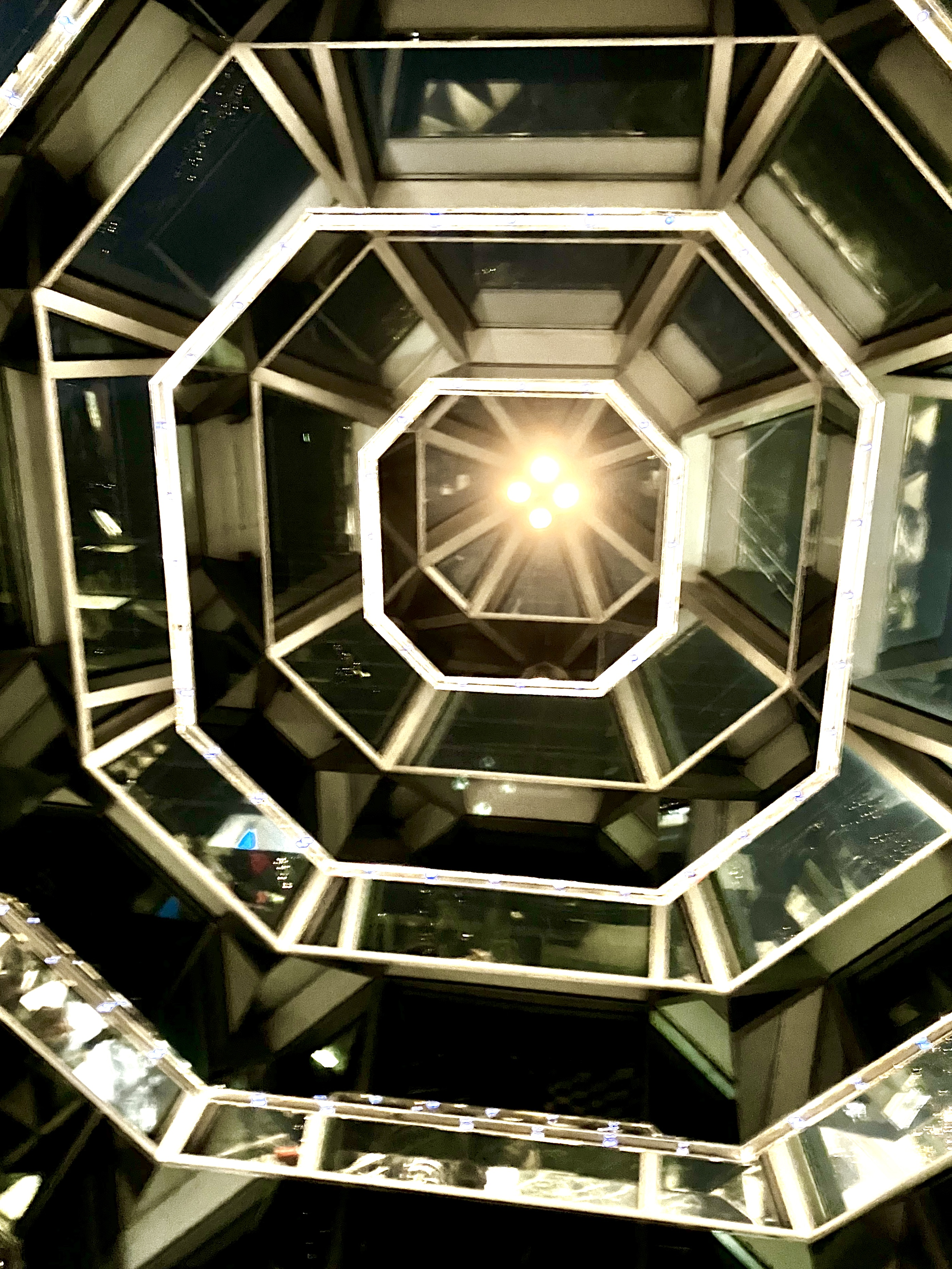
Mirrored vaulted ceilings in lobby of the Millennium Hilton Hotel

As Kevin Roche was put in charge of interior design for Tower One, he therefore echoed the same style of mirrors and alternating dark marble encompassing different geometric shapes. This produced what Stein referred to a "kaleidoscopic effect," as light played off the columns and ceilings, which were similarly clad in geometrically-shaped mirrors and dark marble. However, Dean states that the visual devices Roche used in Tower One "are multiplied and exaggerated to the point of fragmenting space and create too rich a mix of shapes, materials, and illusions." This is seen with "the canopy-like, overhead glass trellises in the elegant Ambassador lounge, [with its] mirrored surfaces throughout alternating with chrome plus dot-like patterns of lights, checkerboard-and diamond-shaped flooring." Secondly, the luxury apartments on the top 13 floors have exceptional views of the UN Secretariat, the East River, and the Manhattan skyline. Both Towers One and Two offer quick access to the United Nations. At the time of the opening, Tower Two's annual rents ranged from $34,000 for a 385-square-foot studio to $144,000 for a two-bedroom duplex.

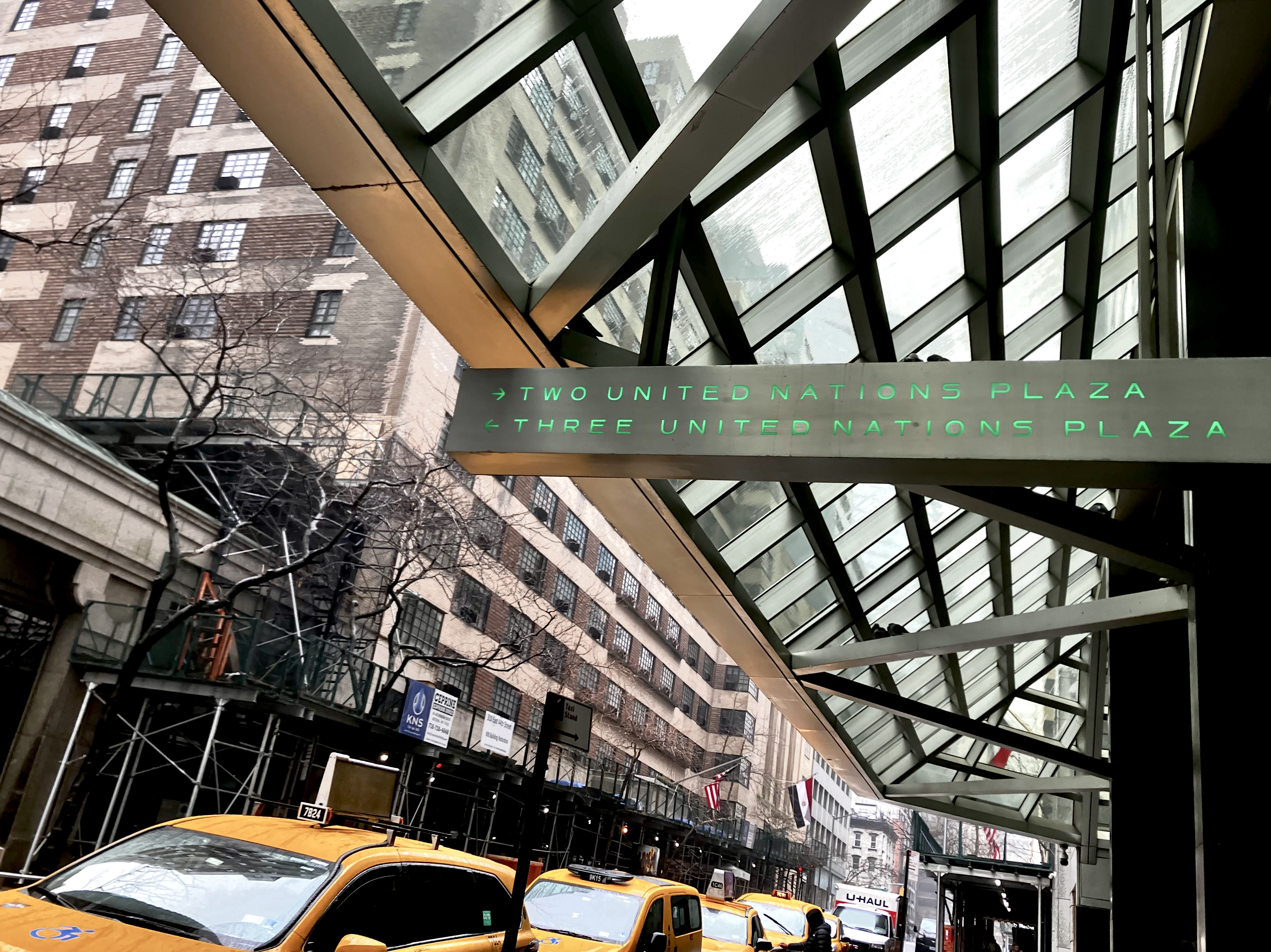
View southwest from under the porte-cochere of Two United Nations Plaza

The principal entry to both buildings has been moved from the original tower to the new tower on 44th Street, which connects via a hypostyle, ramped hall to the 1976 structure. New ground level public spaces consist, from left to right as you enter, of the apartment lobby, hotel reception area, the Wisteria Lounge across from the main entry, a formal seating area with windows overlooking the street and paralleling a ramped hall.

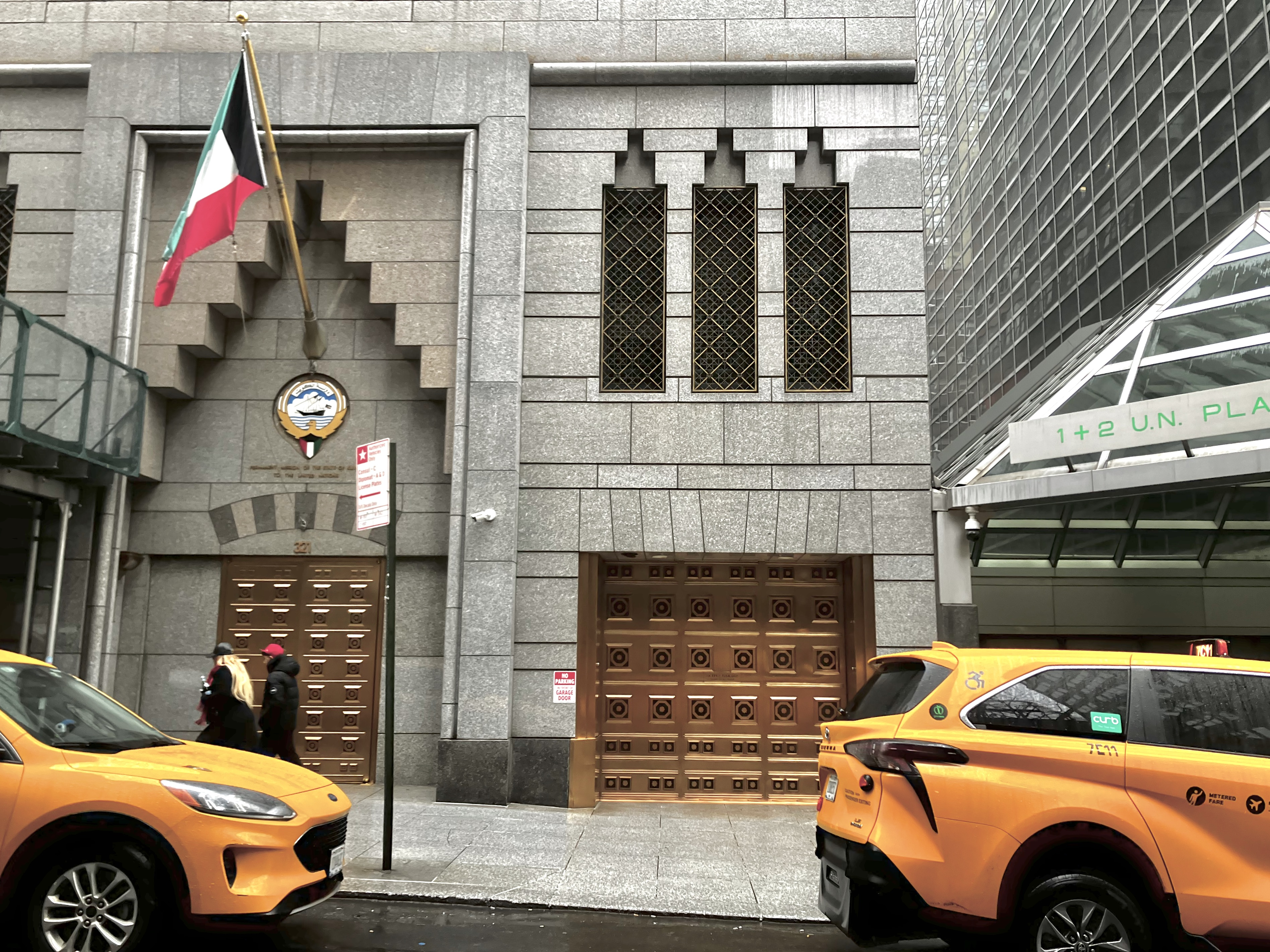
Kuwait Consulate, directly west and next door to the Millennium Hilton hotel and Two United Nations Plaza

There is a little Wisteria room, which borrowed the motifs from the wisteria trellis in Central Park with white lattice work. Dean states negatively that where Roche is more lavish, overcrowding small spaces, it becomes too busy for the eye.

Just over the main lobby is a pyramidal-shaped square skylight, composed of multi-faceted clear glass and mirrors, gradually stepping upward in four layers or steps edged in chrome and small lights. A similar skylight with twice as many sides, facets, and steps occurs just a few feet away over the lobby's front desk and registration area. On the lobby floors are numerous types of marble-veined green, black tiles, all patterned with square and diamond shapes. Walls are faced with mirror, clear glass, chrome, and marble, while overhead yellow and silver metals, reflective and plain glass, chamfered fixtures, sky- lights, and decorative incandescent light points are present. Dean stated negatively that Roche's effect was to lower perceived ceiling heights rather than raise them as Roche intended. And where columns in the original lobby were simple, four-sided and mirrored, those in the new lobby have eight alternating mirror and marble faces, and are banded in chrome and double-chamfered at the top to form capitals, single chamfered at the bottom to create bases. Roche made use of the old registration front desk within one side of his hypostyle or columned hall. At the end of the hypostyle-corridor is an eight-sided, faceted mirror which resembles a stop sign, with multiple reflections of a flower arrangement in front of it. The quieter lobby of the 1976 hotel is on one side of the hypostyle corridor.

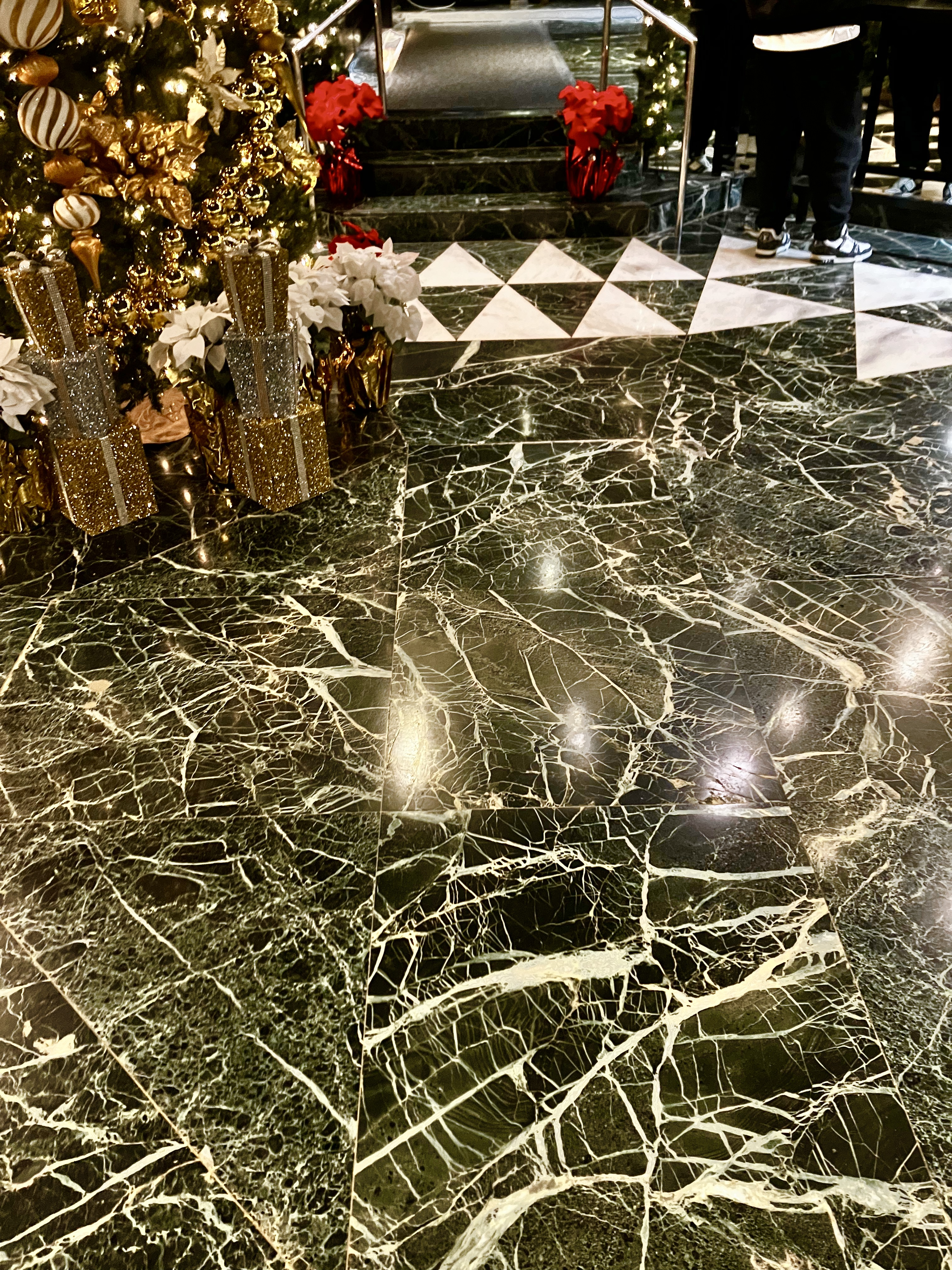
Green marbled foyers in lobby of the Millennium Hilton Hotel

Roche was consumed by saving money in order to silence his earlier critics over the denial of the earlier $300 million-plus price tag for a large, three-tower/hotel glass-enclosed complex. By chamfering and bevelling the new tower's eight-sided columns with reflective materials and alternating marble-patterned colors and shapes, Roche said was the wisest alternative to the costly painted panels and fabrics with expensive elaborate moldings by traditional interior decorators. However, Andrea Dean countered that "the careful proportions, simplicity, hierarchy of forms and shapes that are hallmarks of classicism are sorely missed and the sense of firm conviction about design so evident in the towers' exteriors seems somewhat shaken once one comes in from outdoors."

Tower Two's staff members were chosen for their linguistic abilities. The staff spoke up to 30 languages. Early criticism of staff members and guests who complained about erratic heating and cooling systems were resolved. Early complaints about Tower Two revolved around the impersonal nature of the building which did not deter occupants of the rental units. However, there are 1,000 pieces of delicately hand-crafted needlework obtained from thirty-seven countries world-wide that adorn the walls which help to convey a sense of warmth.

Yearly revenue surpluses from Tower 1 provided part of the financing needed to build Tower 2. In return, Tower 1 and Tower 2 yearly revenue stream enabled UNDC to construct the 15-story residential building across the street: UN PLaza 3. Tower One and Two contain office space, meeting rooms, a hotel, restaurant, health club and apartments for a total area of 925,000 square feet. A single hotel lobby serves both towers and each office portion has a separate office entrance (see above photo of East 44th Street lobby entrance).

Tower Two

"ONE and TWO UN Plaza transformed the vocabulary of Modernism into something more eccentric and picturesque, even sensual … arguably the best glass buildings in Manhattan since the Seagram Building." —P. Goldberger

— Stern, 2006

== History of Turtle Bay ==
Turtle Bay was referred to as Turtle Bay Farm by early settlers. The farm was adjacent to the East River and by the mid-eighteenth century, Turtle Bay Farm extended from about 40th to 49th Street and from Third Avenue to the East River. The farm was named after a cove in Turtle Bay. The cove was given its name from the abundance of turtles in the slow-moving brackish water found along the East River. The cove was located off the East River from about 45th to 48th Streets. Turtle Cove was fed by a small stream that originated at approximately Second Avenue and 48th Street. There was such an abundance of turtles in the cove that residents held a "turtle feast." Filled in for development purposes, the cove is now covered by the gardens of the northern (northeastern half along the East River) border of the United Nations grounds. Eventually, Turtle Bay Farm was replaced by homes (along the northwestern half of Turtle Bay), riverfront industry, and shantytowns beginning from the mid-18th century. Historical records of the "Turtle Bay Gardens Historic District" which is a two-block area along the northwestern half of Turtle Bay (from East 48th to E. 49th Street, between Second and Third Avenues), describe the twenty homes that were built there. Notable people who have lived there include Katharine Hepburn (#244 E. 49th St.), Stephen Sondheim (#246 E. 49th St.), and Tyrone Power. However, these historical records also describe the not-so-notables of Turtle Bay. The outliers who lived there called it "Blood Alley," as the once pristine Turtle Bay Farm and Turtle Cove had become slaughterhouses for their proximity to the cove and river. After renovations in the 1920s, the area underwent a rapid building period, and the cove was filled in.

== Land acquisition ==
During the 1940s, real estate developer William Zeckendorf began actively buying properties in Turtle Bay, to construct or develop the bay. However, he was unsure as to what type of development he would be allowed to build by New York City's Planning Commission or New York's City Council. He coined the term "X City", since he had literally no idea what to build. Both the Planning Commission and New York's City Council are the two powerful organizations that determine the future of building sites in New York City as part of New York's home-rule designation for municipalities. Both are required for a new building, which then needs approval from the at-the-time Board of Estimate, all as important as the mayor's approval, the governor of New York State and New York State's legislature. But it wasn't until 1946 – after World War II – that a 6-square city block and the slaughterhouse area were razed. Then the Third Avenue el train closed in 1955, which was the last of Manhattan's el trains, and the 16-acre area known as Turtle Bay or X City was destined to become the UN Plaza, headquartered at the UN Secretariat, its UN General Assembly and associated buildings.

John D. Rockefeller Jr. reached out to Zeckendorf. He proposed a lump sum cash offer of $8.5 million to Zeckendorf, who leaped at the opportunity. After a round of last-minute negotiations, Rockefeller then gifted it to the UN after "eleventh-hour negotiations" which enabled New York to win the bid over a consortium of local New York businessmen and the cities of Boston, Philadelphia, and San Francisco, who were all leading contenders for the UN site at that time. The bid — negotiated by Zeckendorf between the Rockefellers and Mayor William O'Dwyer of New York City — was won. The group of New York businessmen (including Zeckendorf), who once planned the Turtle Bay site for their "private development," lost after Rockefeller announced he would "give to the city of New York the land as a gift." Mayor O'Dwyer gratefully accepted the gift from the Rockefellers and New York City became the future home of the UN. The Ford Foundation followed and contributed $6.2 million for the Dag Hammarskjold Library to be built along the southern border of the proposed UN site, as well as $6.5 million for a school chartered by the UN. Thus, the "Turtle Bay" area of land — from 42nd to 46th Streets, from the East River to 2nd Avenue — was destined to become the "Capital of the World."

Zeckendorf would later develop Roosevelt Field Shopping Center in the center of Nassau County, which is today still the largest shopping mall on Long Island. The exit M2 off of the Meadowbrook State Parkway in East Garden City and Uniondale, Long Island continues as Zeckendorf Boulevard in his honor. The boulevard serves as the access point to the shopping mall from the parkway.

== Renovation ==
In February 2025, the United Nations Development Corporation and the city and state governments announced that One and Two United Nations Plaza would be renovated for $500 million. Spacesmith was hired to design the renovation, which covered 900,000 square feet (84,000 m^{2}) across both buildings. To finance the project, the UNDC would sell as much as $380 million in bonds.

== Critical reception ==
"Kevin Roche and John Dinkeloo's second tower for the United Nations Plaza Hotel on East 44th Street, a near-twin of the first tower, converts the vocabulary of Modernism into something more eccentric and picturesque, almost sensual," said Paul Goldberger in 1983 prior to Tower Two's opening. Goldberger stated that the building is rich and extravagant and flaunts the traditions of commercial architecture in that it intends to engage the eye. Goldberger also wrote that the new Tower Two was "a crisp abstraction in pale blue reflective glass, a minimalist form full of sharp angles and cut-ins and nips and tucks." Comparing it to the freshly-built AT&T Building, "it could not seem, at first glance, to be more different from the A.T.& T. Building – it is cool and sleek where A.T.& T. is warm and solid, and it is light where A.T.& T. is heavy. It seems to proclaim the future as much as A.T.& T.'s Renaissance arches and pedimented top look to the past." Goldberger was impressed with the style of composition, which he thought was once again coming to play a major role in the act of design. Both buildings were of vital visual interest: pleasing, exciting to look at, and in this sense they both could not be farther from the dreary towers of a previous generation of skyscrapers." Goldberger's enthusiasm for the UN Plaza Tower Two is "modern but no dullness, no rigidity, here – it is more a hedonistic modernism, a re-interpretation of the modernist vocabulary into something rich, lively and even sensual." The style of the UN Plaza Tower Two was described by the writer Charles Jencks as "late modernism."

Like its predecessor and near-twin, it is one of the "few skyscrapers of our time that reminds us what continued richness there can be in the modernist vocabulary."

UN Towers

"The UN Plaza Towers are so welcoming that we do not, at first glance, believe them to be the pure abstractions that they are – these pleasing forms glimmer in the light and seem to invite us in." ―Paul Goldberger

== Gallery ==
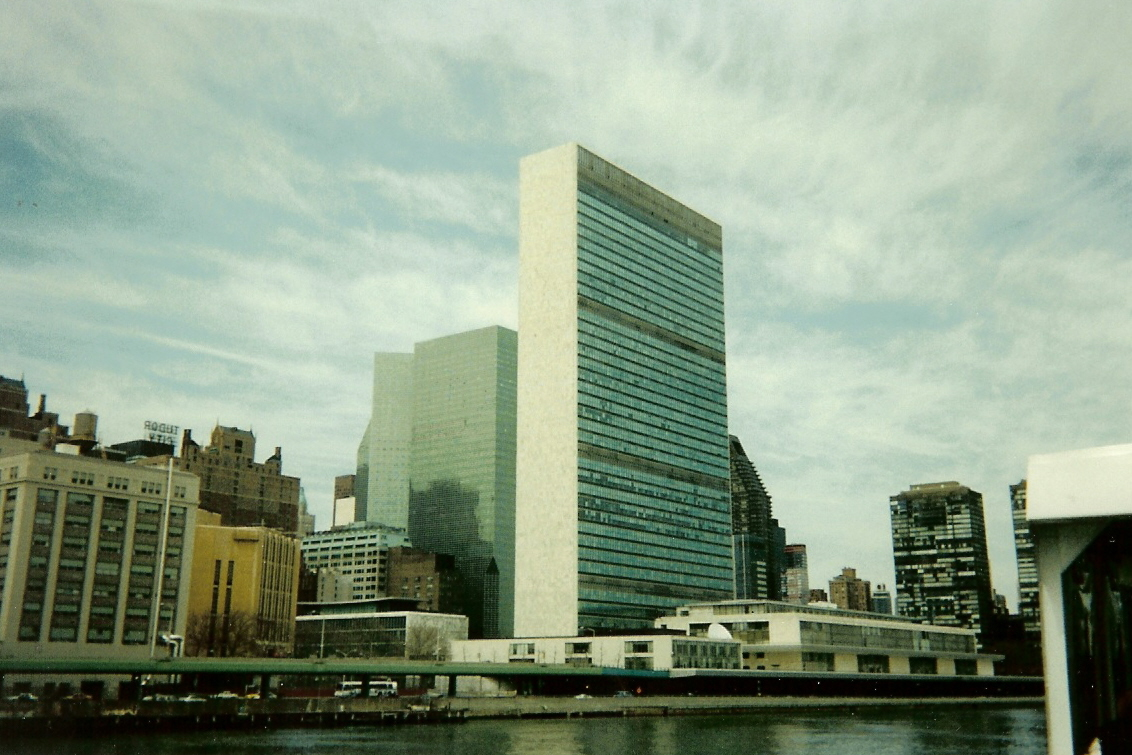
Two UN Plaza viewed southwest from the East River by 22nd St. The UN Secretariat is on the right.

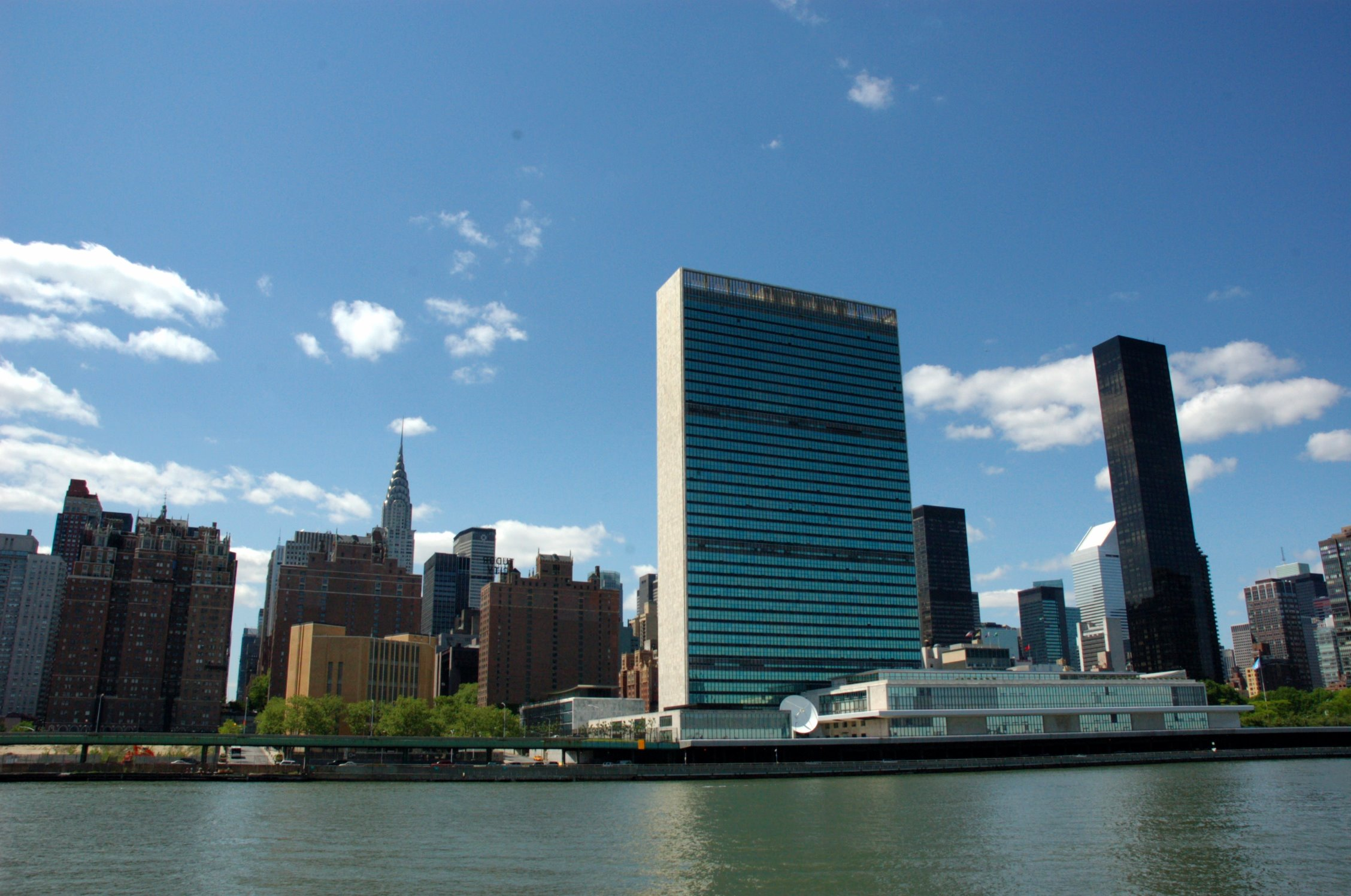
Two UN Plaza viewed northwest from the East River by 39th St. The UN Secretariat is on the left.

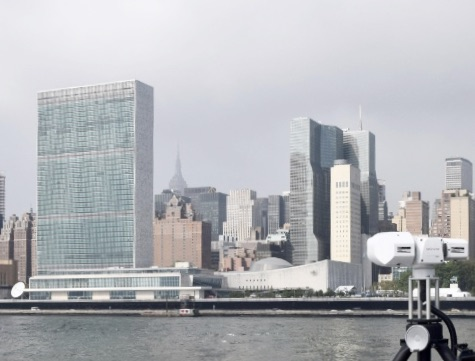
Two UN Plaza viewed west from the East River by 48th St. The UN Secretariat is far left.

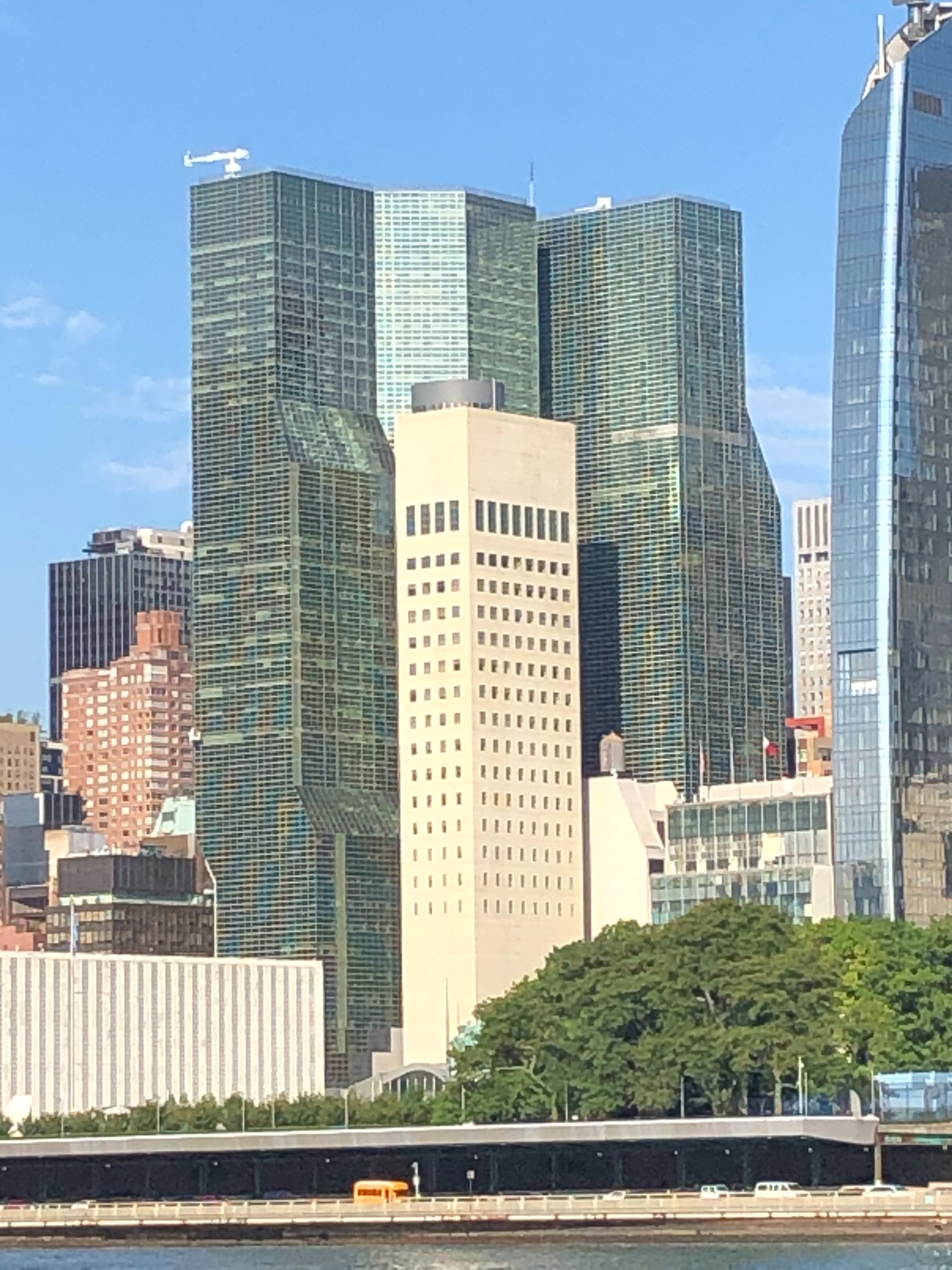
Two UN Plaza (r) viewed southwest by 58th St.

== See also ==
- Architecture of New York City
- List of cities with the most skyscrapers
- List of tallest buildings
- List of tallest buildings in the United States
- One United Nations Plaza
- Three United Nations Plaza
