= Kenneth MacKenzie Murchison =

American architect

Kenneth MacKenzie Murchison, Jr.
- Born: September 29, 1872; Brooklyn, New York, U.S.
- Died: December 15, 1938 (aged 66); New York City, New York, U.S.
- Education: Columbia University (1894); École des Beaux-Arts (1900)
- Occupation: Architect
- Spouse: Aurelie de Mauriac (m. 1902–1938)
- Children: Katherine Murchison Browning; Aurelie Murchison de Wardener
- Parents: Kenneth M. Murchison Sr.; Catherine Elliott Williams

Kenneth MacKenzie Murchison, Jr. (September 29, 1872 – December 15, 1938) was a prominent American Beaux-Arts and Gothic Revival architect.

== Early life ==
He was born in Brooklyn, New York City in 1872. Murchison graduated from Columbia University in 1894 and from the Ecole des Beaux-Arts in Paris, France, in 1900.

== Career ==
Two years after graduating from the École des Beaux-Arts, he opened an office in New York where his first major commissions were for railroad stations for the Pennsylvania Railroad company. Among the stations he designed are Hoboken Terminal in New Jersey; the Lackawanna Terminal and the Lehigh Valley Terminal, both in Buffalo, New York; and Baltimore Pennsylvania Station.

In New York, he was well known as one of the founders of the Beaux Arts Balls, elaborate costume parties benefiting architects who had fallen on hard times. He also was a founder of the Mendelsohn Glee Club. At the time of his death, he had started work on a new Dunes Club to replace the one destroyed a few months earlier.

== Personal life ==
On April 5, 1902, Murchison married Aurelie de Mauriac. They lived in the Beaux-Arts Apartments, which he designed, at 310 E. 44th St. They were the parents of two daughters:

- Katherine Murchison, who married Hays Browning.
- Aurelie Murchison, who married Edouard de Wardener.

Murchison died suddenly, at 11:45 p.m. on December 15, 1938, while at the Interborough Rapid Transit Company's Grand Central–42nd Street station, as The New York Times reported.

== Buildings ==
Name	Location	Date	Built for	Current use	Image
Delaware, Lackawanna and Western Railroad Station	1 Hudson Place, Hoboken, New Jersey	1907	Lackawanna Railroad	Railroad station	
Delaware, Lackawanna and Western Railroad Station	700 Lackawanna Ave at Jefferson Ave, Scranton, Pennsylvania	1908	Lackawanna Railroad	Hotel	
Beaux-Arts Apartments	307 and 310 E. 44th St., New York	1929–1930	Apartments		
U.S. Marine Hospital	Staten Island, New York				
Havana Central railway station	401 Avenida de Bélgica, Havana, Cuba	1912	Congress of Cuba	Railroad station	
Pennsylvania Station	47 Walnut St, Johnstown, Pennsylvania	1916	Pennsylvania Railroad		
Pennsylvania Station	1515 N Charles St, Baltimore, Maryland	1911	Pennsylvania Railroad		
Union Station	1000 Water St at Park St, Jacksonville, Florida	1919	Florida East Coast Railway, et al.	Convention center	
Lincoln Baths	65 S Broadway, Saratoga Springs, NY 12866 (SPA State Park)	1928	New York State Department of Public Works	Museum and Office Space	Lincoln Bath exterior

He also designed:

- Johnstown, Pennsylvania, Station-Johnstown (Amtrak station)
- Jamaica (LIRR station), Jamaica, New York.
- Long Beach (LIRR station), Long Beach, New York.
- The original Dunes Club, Narragansett, Rhode Island. (Only the gatehouse remains after the 1938 hurricane.)
- Sands Point Bath Club, East Egg, LI (destroyed by fire in 1986)
- Forest Hills Stadium, West Side Tennis Club, Forest Hills, Queens, New York City
- New Colonial Hotel, Nassau
- First National Bank Building, Hoboken, New Jersey
- The Murchison Building, Wilmington, North Carolina
- Co-op Apartments, 39 E. 79th St., New York.
- The Tully House (Residence), Mill Neck, New York
- Luola Chapel, built at Orton Plantation in Brunswick, North Carolina, in memory of his sister who died in 1916. He also added wings to the main house.
- Summer Residences, Narragansett, Rhode Island
- Primelles Building, Havana, Cuba (American Architect. Vol. 119, Part 1)
- St. Elmo Hall, home to the St. Elmo Society, at 111 Grove Street at Yale University, today known as Rosenfeld Hall.
- William A. Clark House (with Lord and Hewlett)
