= Roche-Dinkeloo =

American architectural firm based in Hamden, Connecticut

Kevin Roche John Dinkeloo & Associates
- Type: LLC
- Industry: Architecture
- Founded: Hamden, Connecticut, United States (1966)
- Founder: Kevin Roche and John Dinkeloo
- Headquarters: New Haven, Connecticut, United States
- Area served: International
- Key people: Principals: Kevin Roche AIA FAIA
- Services: Architecture, building services/MEP engineering, graphics, interior design, structural engineering, civil engineering, sustainable design and urban design & planning
- Website: www.krjda.com

Roche Dinkeloo, otherwise known as Kevin Roche John Dinkeloo and Associates LLC (KRJDA), was an architectural firm based in Hamden, Connecticut. It was created in 1966, succeeding Eero Saarinen & Associates. In 2020, it relocated to New Haven, Connecticut, and took the name Roche Modern.

== About ==
The principal designers were 1982 Pritzker Prize laureate Kevin Roche (June 1922 – 2019), with John Dinkeloo—a graduate of the University of Michigan—as the expert in construction and technology. Both had previously worked for Eero Saarinen's architecture firm, Eero Saarinen & Associates. Saarinen, who died in 1961, had wanted his architectural practice to be renamed no later than five years after his death. Accordingly, in 1966, Saarinen & Associates was rebranded as Kevin Roche John Dinkeloo and Associates. After Roche's death, the firm relaunched in 2020 as Roche Modern under director Jerry Boryca and managing director Eamon Roche. The firm is now based out of New Haven, Connecticut.

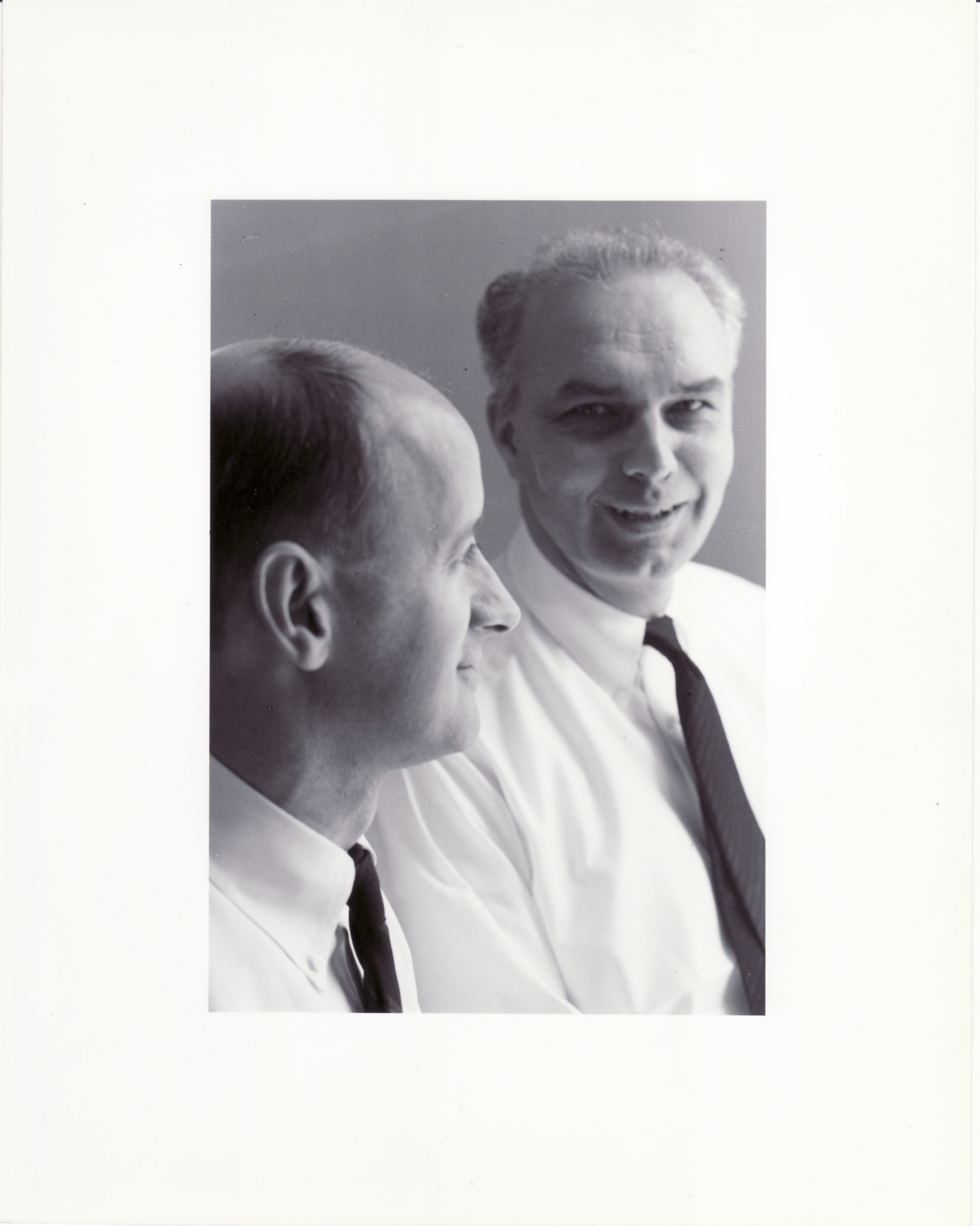
Kevin Roche (left) and John Dinkeloo (right), 1967

Roche and Dinkeloo both previously worked with Eero Saarinen. Almost all buildings built by Roche are with this firm, and they exhibit his particular architecture and aesthetic, although it has changed wildly throughout the past 40 years. Earlier buildings were characterized by massive facades and experimentation with exposed steel and concrete, while more recent buildings emphasize a clean, glassy look suggesting futuristic and green architecture. The firm also built in postmodern and historicist styles during the early 1990s.

KRJDA

"KRJDA is engaged in major projects throughout the United States, Europe and Asia and provides complete master planning, programming, architectural design, interior design, working drawings, specification and construction administration services. The firm has designed a variety of institutional and corporate projects including 38 corporate headquarters, three hotel/apartment buildings, eight museums, numerous research facilities, theaters, schools, factories, performing arts centers, houses, the Metropolitan Museum of Art, and the Central Park Zoo in New York City."

— www.krjda.com

The firm received the American Institute of Architects 1974 Architectural Firm Award and in 1995 the firm was the recipient of the American Institute of Architect's 25-Year Award for the Ford Foundation Headquarters in New York City. In 1982, Roche received the Pritzker Prize and in 1993, he received the AIA Gold Medal. In 2015, he received the George Malcolm White Award from the American Architectural Foundation. Roche has been referred to as the "first [architect] to see architecture and nature as one."

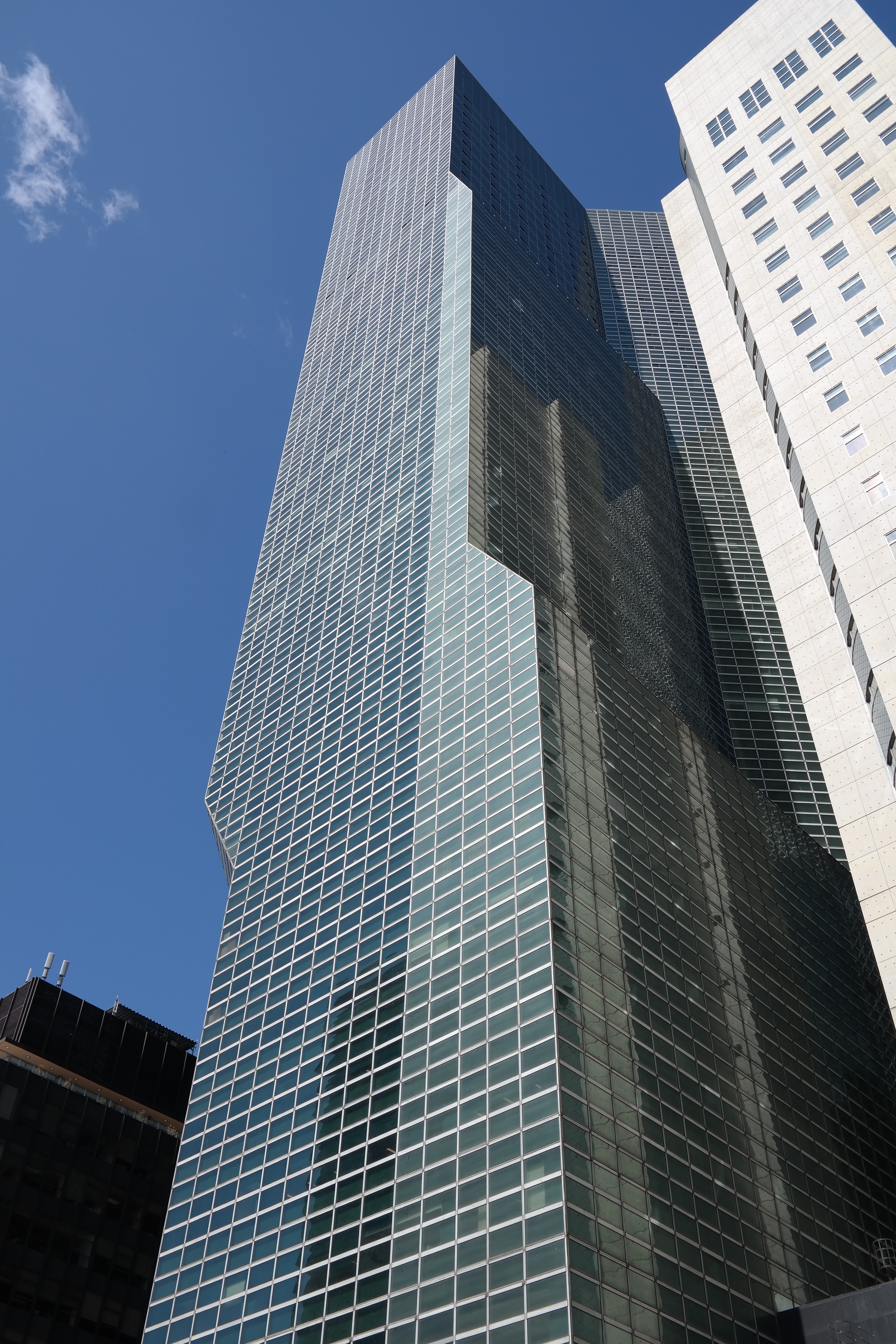
One UN Plaza depicting Roche-Dinkeloo's signature modernist design, showing chamfers or slant backs on northern and southern faces (1975)

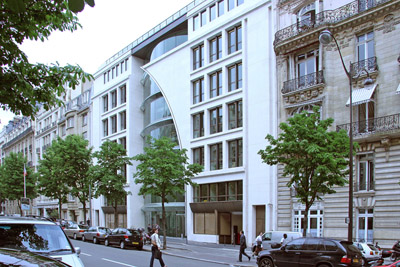
The Head Office for Bouygues SA Holding company received the "Haute Qualité Environnementale" (HQE), the highest certification for environmental quality in building design in France.

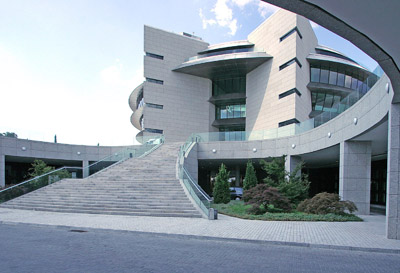
Headquarters of Santander Central Hispano, in Madrid, Spain

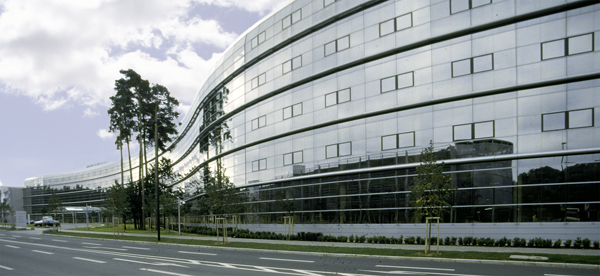
The continuous glass wall at Lucent Technologies in Nuremberg, Germany, wraps around the complex to create a unified street facade.

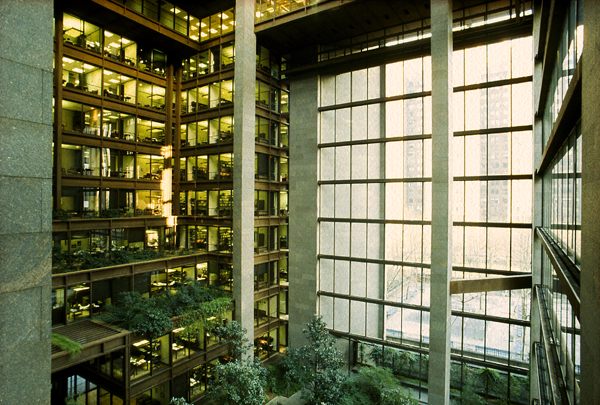
The Ford Foundation Center for Social Justice

== Projects ==
KRJDA has completed over 200 projects in the US and internationally. These include 8 museums, 38 institutional and corporate headquarters, seven research laboratories, conference and performing arts centers, theaters, and campus buildings for six separate universities. KRJDA maintained its office in Hamden, Connecticut.

== Film ==
A feature documentary about Kevin Roche and his work, called Kevin Roche: The Quiet Architect, was released in 2017. It was directed by Irish filmmaker (ex-architecture student) Mark Noonan, whose 2015 debut feature You're Ugly Too starred Aidan Gillen and was met with critical acclaim.

== Notable buildings ==
- 1968 – The Ford Foundation Center for Social Justice, New York City
- 1969 – Oakland Museum of California, Oakland, California
- 1969 – Administration, Student Union & Physical Education Buildings, RIT, Rochester, New York
- 1969 – The Knights of Columbus Building Headquarters, New Haven, Connecticut
- 1969 – United States Post Office, Columbus, Indiana
- 1969 – Aetna Life and Casualty Company Computer Headquarters, Hartford, Connecticut
- 1971 – Power Center for the Performing Arts, University of Michigan, Ann Arbor, Michigan
- 1973 – Center for the Arts, Wesleyan University, Middletown, Connecticut
- 1974 – Fine Arts Center, University of Massachusetts Amherst, Amherst, Massachusetts
- 1974 – The Pyramids (Indianapolis) College Life Insurance Company of America Headquarters, Indianapolis
- 1974 – Worcester Plaza, Worcester, Massachusetts
- 1975 – One United Nations Plaza and ONE UN New York Hotel, New York City
- 1978 – John Deere World Headquarters West Office Building, Moline, Illinois
- 1979 – Denver Performing Arts Complex, Denver
- 1982 – One Summit Square, Fort Wayne, Indiana
- 1982 – The Corporate Center, Danbury, Connecticut
- 1982 – Moudy Visual Arts and Communication Building, Texas Christian University, Fort Worth, Texas
- 1983 – Two United Nations Plaza and ONE UN New York Hotel, New York City
- 1983 – General Foods Corporate Headquarters, Ryebrook, New York
- 1985 – Cummins Corporate Office Building, Columbus, Indiana
- 1985 – DeWitt Wallace Decorative Arts Museum, Williamsburg, Virginia
- 1986 – Conoco Inc. Petroleum Headquarters, Houston
- 1987 - Three United Nations Plaza New York City (UNICEF Headquarters)
- 1988 – Central Park Zoo, New York City
- 1988 – Bouygues World Headquarters, Saint-Quentin-Yvelines, France
- 1989 – Leo Burnett Building Company Headquarters, Chicago
- 1990 – 750 Seventh Avenue, New York City
- 1990 – Metropolitano Office Building, Madrid
- 1992 – J.P. Morgan Tower, New York City
- 1993 – Corning Incorporated Corporate Headquarters, Corning, New York
- 1993 – Merck & Co. Inc. Headquarters, Whitehouse Station, New Jersey
- 1993 – Bank of America Plaza, Atlanta
- 1993 – Borland International Corporate Headquarters, Scotts Valley, California
- 1993 – Tanjong and Binariang Headquarters/Menara Maxis, Kuala Lumpur, Malaysia
- 1994 – Pontiac Marina Millenia Tower and The Ritz-Carlton Millenia Singapore
- 1995 – Dai-ichi Life Headquarters/ Norinchukin Bank Headquarters, DN Tower 21, Tokyo
- 1997 – Zesiger Sports and Fitness Center, Massachusetts Institute of Technology, Cambridge, Massachusetts
- 1997 – Shiodome City Center, Tokyo
- 1997 – Helen and Martin Kimmel Center for University Life/ Skirball Center for the Performing Arts, New York University, New York City
- 1997 – Lucent Technologies, Lisle and Naperville, Illinois
- 2000 – Ciudad Grupo Santander, Madrid
- 2001 – Securities and Exchange Commission Headquarters, Washington, D.C.
- 2002 – Bouygues S.A. Holding Company Headquarters, Paris
- 2003 – 1101 New York Avenue, Washington, D.C.
- 2005 – Lafayette Tower, Washington, D.C.
- 2009 – David S. Ingalls Rink Restoration and Addition, Yale University, New Haven, Connecticut
- 2010 – Convention Centre Dublin (2010)
- 2011 – New Galleries for the Art of the Arab Lands, Turkey, Iran, Central Asia, and Later South Asia at the Metropolitan Museum of Art
- 2012 – American Painting Galleries in the American Wing at the Metropolitan Museum of Art
- 2014 – Renovations to United Nations Development Corporation
- 2018 – 200/250 Massachusetts Ave Capitol Crossing
- 2020 – Expansion at Museum of Jewish Heritage
- 2022 – Renovation and finish of Plaza Pilin
