= Millennium Hilton New York One UN Plaza =

Hotel in Manhattan, New York

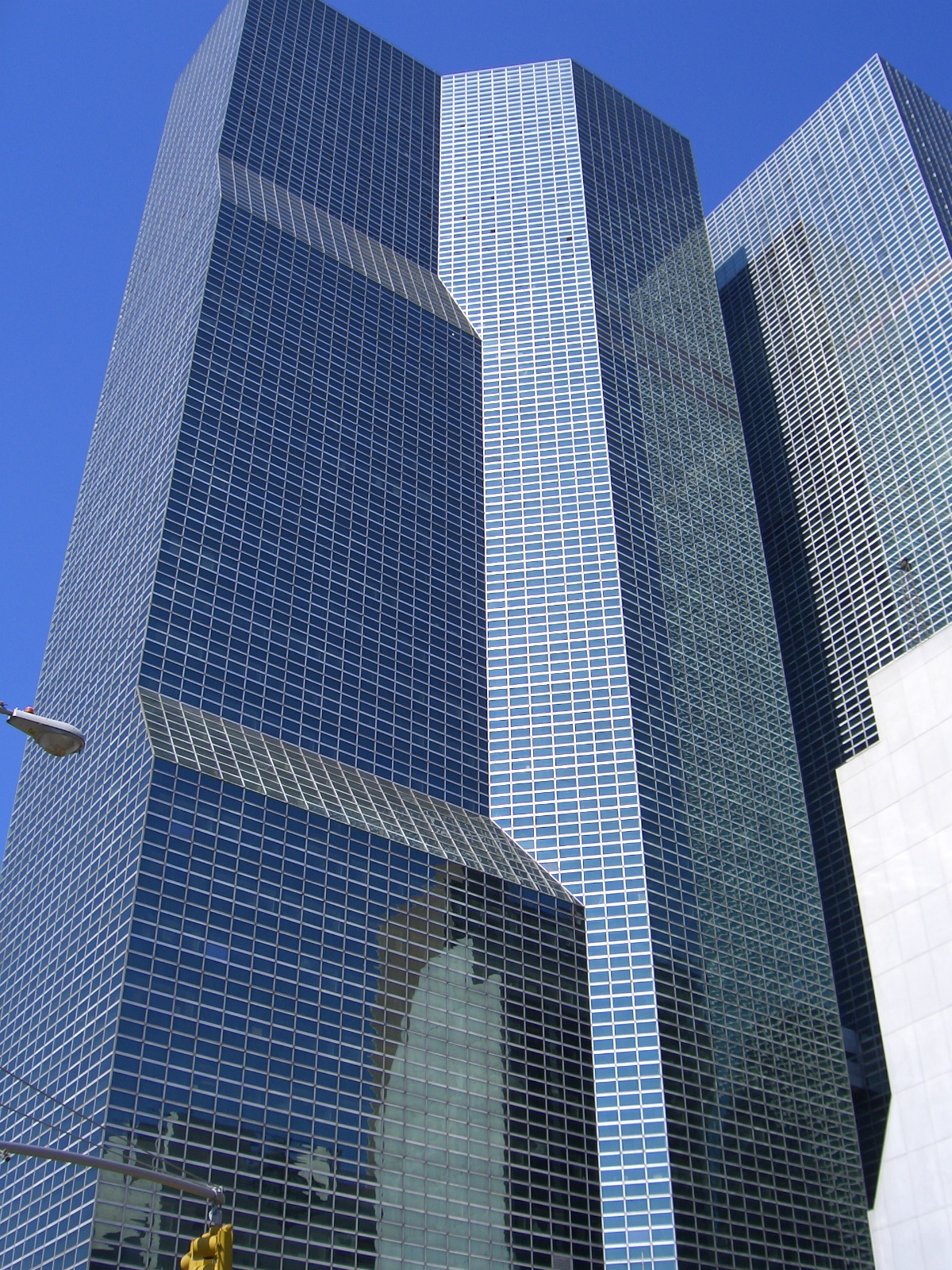
- The hotel is on the top stories of One and Two United Nations Plaza.
- Interactive map of the Millennium Hilton New York One UN Plaza area
- Former names: United Nations Plaza Hotel, Millennium UN Plaza
- Hotel chain: Hilton Hotels

General information
- Type: Hotel
- Location: 1 and 2 United Nations Plaza, Manhattan, New York City, United States
- Coordinates: 40°45′02″N 73°58′09″W
- Completed: June 8, 1976; 50 years ago
- Owner: Millennium & Copthorne Hotels

Height
- Height: 505 ft (154 m)

Technical details
- Floor count: 13 (Note: The hotel occupies floors 27–39 in both One and Two United Nations Plaza. Both buildings are physically 39 stories tall.)

Design and construction
- Architect: Kevin Roche
- Architecture firm: Roche-Dinkeloo

Other information
- Number of rooms: 439
- Facilities: Ambassador Grill; Millennium Health and Racquet Club

Website
- www3.hilton.com/en/hotels/new-york/millennium-hilton-new-york-one-un-plaza-NYCUPHH/index.html

New York City Landmark
- Designated: January 17, 2017
- Reference no.: 2588
- Designated entity: Interior: Lobby and Ambassador Grill

The Millennium Hilton New York One UN Plaza is a 439-room hotel in the East Midtown neighborhood of Manhattan in New York City, United States. Designed by architect Kevin Roche of the firm Roche-Dinkeloo and opened in 1976, the hotel is located at 44th Street and First Avenue, near the headquarters of the United Nations. It occupies part of the ground floor and top 13 stories of One and Two United Nations Plaza, a pair of 39-story skyscrapers also designed by Roche-Dinkeloo. The UN Plaza Hotel is owned by Millennium & Copthorne Hotels and operated by Hilton Hotels & Resorts. Part of the hotel's interior is a New York City designated landmark.

One and Two United Nations Plaza, which respectively opened in 1975 and 1983, are both mixed-use buildings with offices on their lowest stories. The exteriors of both buildings have an angular massing bent at several places, as well as a facade made of glass. The ground story contains the lobby, which consists of a reception area, foyer, and ramp with mirrored surfaces and polygonal lamps. The ramp leads to the Ambassador Grill and Bar at the rear of the hotel; the grill is a popular meeting spot for United Nations diplomats. There are restaurants and meeting spaces on the second story and guest rooms on the 27th through 39th stories. In addition, the hotel contains a swimming pool and an indoor tennis court.

The United Nations Development Corporation (UNDC) developed the hotel, which was owned by the New York City government and operated by Hyatt. The hotel opened on June 8, 1976, with 288 rooms on the top 13 stories of One UN Plaza. The UN Plaza Hotel was further expanded in 1984 after the completion of Two UN Plaza. The hotel was popular among UN diplomats and was consistently profitable in the first two decades of its operation. The New York City government sold the hotel in 1997 to Regal Hotels International, and Millennium & Copthorne Hotels took over the hotel in 1999, renovating it two years later. The hotel was further renovated in the 2010s, during which the Ambassador Grill and the lobby were protected as landmarks. The UN Plaza Hotel became part of the Hilton brand in 2017.

== Buildings ==
The United Nations Hotel occupies the top 13 stories of One and Two United Nations Plaza, a pair of 39-story (Note: The top stories are numbered 44.) mixed-use buildings designed by Kevin Roche of Roche-Dinkeloo. The complex was constructed by the government of New York City. One United Nations Plaza, completed in 1975, is the older of the two buildings and was the first large hotel and office building in New York City. Two United Nations Plaza opened in 1983 as an office, residential, and hotel building. One and Two United Nations Plaza are also known respectively as DC1 and DC2. There is a 30 ft (9.1 m) gap between the towers on their upper stories. The two buildings wrap around the 20-story United States Mission to the United Nations on 45th Street and First Avenue.

One United Nations Plaza is located at the corner of 44th Street and First Avenue. The office entrance is on First Avenue, while the hotel entrance is on 44th Street. A canopy shields the hotel's entrance and runs across the width of both buildings. One United Nations Plaza's lowest 26 stories contain offices, while the top 13 stories contain the hotel. One United Nations Plaza's 505 ft (154 m) height was dictated by the fact that, under New York City law, it could not be taller than the United Nations Secretariat Building. The building has an L-shaped plan and a facade composed of blue-green glass. The facade is divided into rectangles measuring 4 ft 7 in (140 cm) wide and 2 ft 7.5 in (80.0 cm) high. These are arranged into semi-reflective glass panels and glass spandrels, the arrangement of which differs on the upper and lower stories. (Note: On each of the office stories, each bay contains two panels of semi-reflective glass, and there are four narrow spandrel panels between each story. On each of the hotel stories, each bay contains one panel of semi-reflective glass and three narrow spandrel panels between each story.) To comply with zoning regulations, the northern facade contains two setbacks sloped at a 45-degree angle, while the southeast corner has a cutback on its lowest 12 stories. Additionally, the second-story facade slopes outward, creating a canopy above the ground floor. The setbacks are placed above the office stories, which have a larger floor area.

Two United Nations Plaza has a similar design to One UN Plaza. The building is located on 44th Street and has a chamfer on its southeastern corner, which leads to the hotel's lobby. The lowest 23 stories of Two United Nations Plaza contain office space. Above the office stories are sloped setbacks similar to those in One UN Plaza. Both buildings are connected at their lobbies, as well as on the 3rd and 11th floors.

Paul Goldberger called One United Nations Plaza "one of the finest postwar skyscrapers in the city", while John Tauranac said the building "shimmers in the sun" as seen from a distance. William Marlin said the structure "assumes a key spot in the tradition of the tall building". By contrast, Two United Nations Plaza received comparatively little commentary when it was completed. Goldberger wrote that the second building "converts the vocabulary of Modernism into something more eccentric and picturesque, almost sensual", and he believed the two buildings to be "welcoming" despite not relating to their surroundings. According to architectural writer Eeva-Liisa Pelkonen, the two buildings formed a "kaleidoscope, always changing, always moving [...] a destination and an active participant in the disco era of the late 1970s and the 1980s".

== Design ==
=== Lobby ===
==== Original lobby ====
When the hotel opened, its lobby was a small T-shaped space on 44th Street. The lobby extended westward to a driveway at the middle of the block, connecting 44th and 45th Streets. Dignitaries could use a private elevator off the hotel's driveway, allowing them to bypass the lobby entirely. The lobby's floors, and the wainscoting on the lowest part of the lobby's walls, were made of Italian verde antique marble. Above the wainscoting was a chrome railing with indirect lighting; its presence obviated the need for table lamps. The rest of the lobby contained fabric panels, which had a similar texture to velvet. The lobby led to a reception area, with a desk and a floor decorated in a black-and-white checkerboard pattern. Next to the lobby was a Chemical Bank branch and an International News Corporation office. The original lobby, adjacent to the hotel's eastern bank of elevators, no longer exists.

==== Current lobby ====
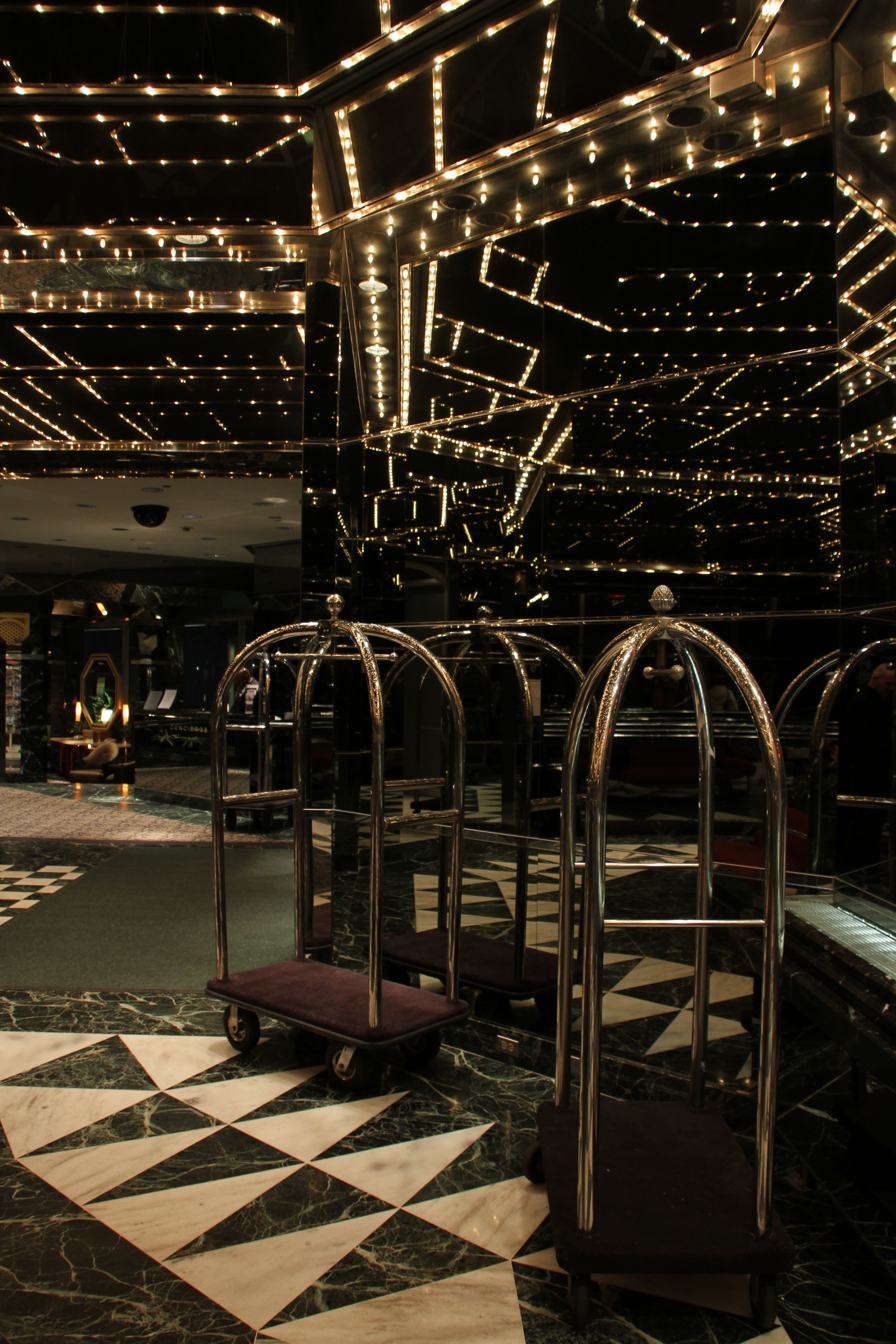
Foyer of the hotel

The modern lobby, which occupies the base of both buildings, opened in 1983 and consists of a foyer, reception hall, and ramp. A revolving door on 44th Street leads to the foyer, an octagonal hall with a skylight. The floor of the foyer contains squares of dark-green and white veined marble in a checkerboard pattern. The ceiling of the foyer contains chandeliers, each of which contain four rectangular tiers of light bulbs spaced at regular intervals. According to Roche, the foyer's columns incorporate classical design elements, although the columns' design may have also been inspired by ancient Egyptian or Art Deco sources. The walls are decorated with mirrors, transparent glass, and chrome and marble panels.

Immediately across from the main entrance, to the north of the foyer, was the Wisteria Lounge. This space served as a cafe and was decorated with trellises; it was converted into a gift shop in 1995. To the left (west) of the foyer is a reception area, which is designed in a similar manner to the foyer. The main differences in the design are that the floor of the reception area has green-and-white triangles, and the reception area's chandeliers consist of six tiers of light bulbs, arranged in a pyramidal shape. The ceiling is also illuminated by a skylight. The reception area also serves the apartments on the top stories of Two UN Plaza.

To the right (east) of the foyer is a ramp, which leads to the original elevator lobby and the Ambassador Grill inside One UN Plaza. The floor of the hallway consists of white-veined tiles of green marble, which are partially covered by a carpet. On either side of the hallway are four octagonal columns of polished green marble on rectangular pedestals. Each column has mirrored panels on its sides, which are wrapped with horizontal bands, as well as a polygonal capital at its top. The columns divide the hallway into several bays, each of which contains a coved ceiling with mirrored panels. Each bay of the coved ceiling has a multi-tiered pyramidal chandelier with small light bulbs. At the end of the hallway is a small seating area and the eastern bank of elevators (the latter of which were part of the original lobby). Originally, there was an octagonal mirror with floral decorations at the end of this hallway.

=== Ambassador Grill and Bar ===
The Ambassador Grill and Bar, now the Ambassador Grill and the Ambassador Lounge, are accessible both from the hotel's lobby and from 44th Street. The restaurant is sunken slightly below ground level and occupies an irregularly shaped space at the northern end of the hotel. It was the only public restaurant designed by the Roche-Dinkeloo firm. The Ambassador Grill became a popular meeting spot for United Nations diplomats after it opened in 1975, and it retained this status throughout the years. The restaurant offered a wide range of foods to accommodate the different tastes of the hotel's clientele. According to the hotel's catering manager: "We try to design menus that everyone can eat—it's embarrassing to be singled out."

The restaurant is accessed via a set of steps past the eastern bank of elevators. The walls and piers are set at 45-degree angles and contain dark mirrors. In a New York magazine article, Roche explained why he had added the mirrors: "You want the space to go on and on [...] but you also want to avoid the feeling of a cafeteria". The far end of the room contained a bar with a mirror. Originally, the restaurant was decorated red; this color was also used in staff uniforms, vases, and serving plates. The floor contains a twisting path with dark green and white marble tiles, which runs from the entrance to the dining areas. The room has a dropped ceiling, which is decorated with mirrors and glass trellises. The ceiling above the main pathway includes rectangular glass panels, held in place by metal slats; Ada Louise Huxtable compared it to the roof of a greenhouse. The trellises above the seating area contain angled rows of light bulbs, giving the impression of infinite reflections. Tapestries were placed in acrylic boxes for decoration.

=== Upper stories ===
==== Guest rooms ====
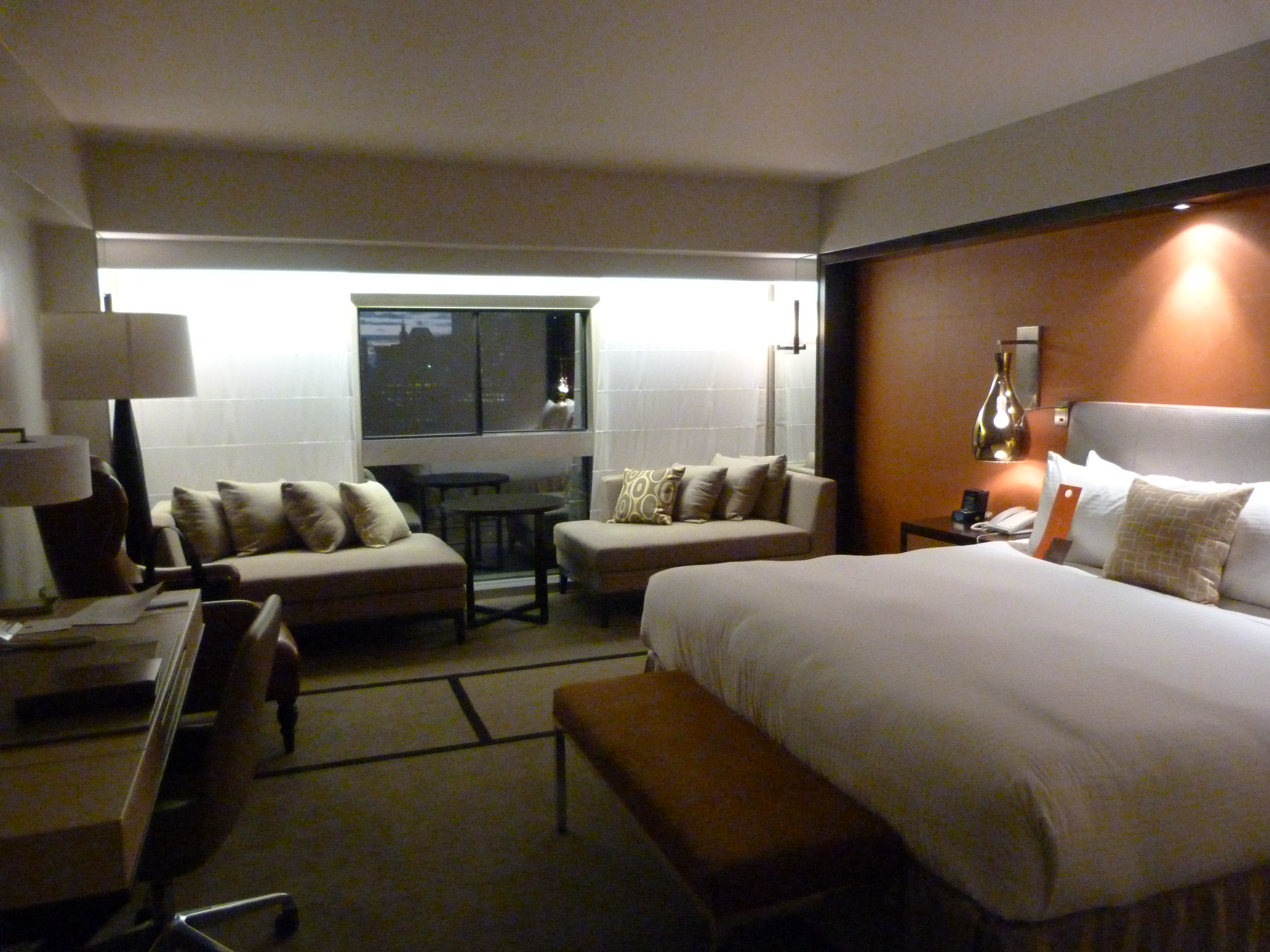
A room in the hotel

The hotel originally comprised 288 rooms on the top 13 stories of One United Nations Plaza. The corridors leading to the guestrooms were clad in green marble, interspersed with mirrored strips. The original rooms were generally small, except for the suites, many of which were duplexes that contained spiral staircases. Angela Taylor of The New York Times wrote that the lower levels of the suites had grand pianos, while the upper levels had two bedrooms each. The rooms contained various garments, fabrics, and tapestries, some of which had been created as early as the eighth century. Mae Festa, an interior designer working in Roche-Dinkeloo's office, had acquired the tapestries from various antique stores and flea markets worldwide. The rooms contained fabrics in muted colors such as rose-beige, gray-blue, and taupe. Despite the hotel's proximity to the UN headquarters, it only had one presidential suite, compared to 26 such suites at the Waldorf Astoria New York several blocks away.

After the hotel was expanded in the early 1980s, it had 427 or 428 rooms. As of 2024, the hotel has 439 units, consisting of a presidential suite, 33 regular suites, and 405 standard guestrooms. Although Two United Nations Plaza contains 198 rooms on its highest 13 stories, some of Two UN Plaza's residential units were not part of the hotel. The units range from a 385 ft^{2} (35.8 m^{2}) studio apartment to a duplex apartment with two bedrooms. Tenants could pay rent annually to live in these apartments, or they could rent a studio for a nightly fee (essentially using it as a hotel room). The rooms had over 1,000 pieces of embroidery from 37 nations.

==== Amenity areas ====
The second story contained the Coffee Mill, a cafe that served European food. There were also three meeting rooms named after U Thant, Dag Hammarskjöld, and Trygve Lie, former secretaries-general of the United Nations. The modern hotel contains seven meeting rooms, which cover 7,500 square feet (700 m^{2}) and can fit up to three hundred guests. The hotel has hosted wedding receptions for ceremonies that have taken place in the Chapel at the United Nations, across 44th Street.

There is a 40 ft-long (12 m) swimming pool on the 27th story of One UN Plaza, which is accessible to guests in both buildings. The pool contains mirrored walls and piers, similar to those in the Ambassador Grill and the lobby, and was covered by an Oriental-style canopy. This story also contains a sauna and a gymnasium. The pool, sauna, and gymnasium are accessed by a corridor that ran alongside the glass facade, with a mirrored wall on the other side.

There is a tennis court on the 39th story, atop the roof of One UN Plaza. At the time of its opening, the UN Plaza was the only hotel in New York City with an indoor tennis court. The pool, tennis court, sauna, and gym were originally operated by the Turtle Bay Tennis and Swim Club. The Millennium Health and Racquet Club continued to operate the pool and tennis court in the early 21st century. An executive lounge, known as the Skyline Club, is on the 30th story of the western tower and is accessible for an extra fee. The hotel also contains a fitness center.

== History ==
=== Development ===
By 1966, the headquarters of the United Nations was overcrowded, leading US and UN officials and the Ford Foundation to develop plans for new office space, hotels, and apartments nearby. Officials proposed four projects around the UN headquarters. Only one component, United Nations Plaza, was ultimately executed; the United Nations Development Corporation (UNDC) was formed in 1968 to develop the complex. United Nations Plaza was originally planned to be built on a superblock bounded by 43rd Street, 45th Street, First Avenue, and Second Avenue. Roche-Dinkeloo released revised plans in November 1969, which called for a 700-room hotel and three connected office buildings with 3×10^{6} ft^{2} (280,000 m^{2}) of space. The plan attracted much public opposition. U.S. congressman Ed Koch criticized the proposed development's bulk, while journalist Pete Hamill believed the development unfairly benefited "free-loading diplomats assigned to the UN" by allowing them to live next to their workplace. The New York City Planning Commission narrowly approved the plan in 1970. The government of New York City would own the buildings and lease them to the UNDC.

In 1971, the UNDC and New York State Legislature agreed to a plan that only provided funding for the first planned building. Two years later, the Turner Construction Company began constructing the 39-story One United Nations Plaza. The State Legislature authorized a bond issue that provided up to $75 million in funding for the first building. One UN Plaza was completed in November 1975 at a cost of $30 million. Hyatt had been selected to operate a hotel in the new building, which was not yet operational but was planned to serve diplomats, politicians, and other people working at or visiting the UN headquarters. The United Nations Plaza Hotel's 150 staff members, who collectively spoke 27 languages, were trained for four months prior to the hotel's official opening. As part of the training process, several high-ranking staff members simulated "finicky guests" for a week before the hotel opened.

=== Hyatt operation ===
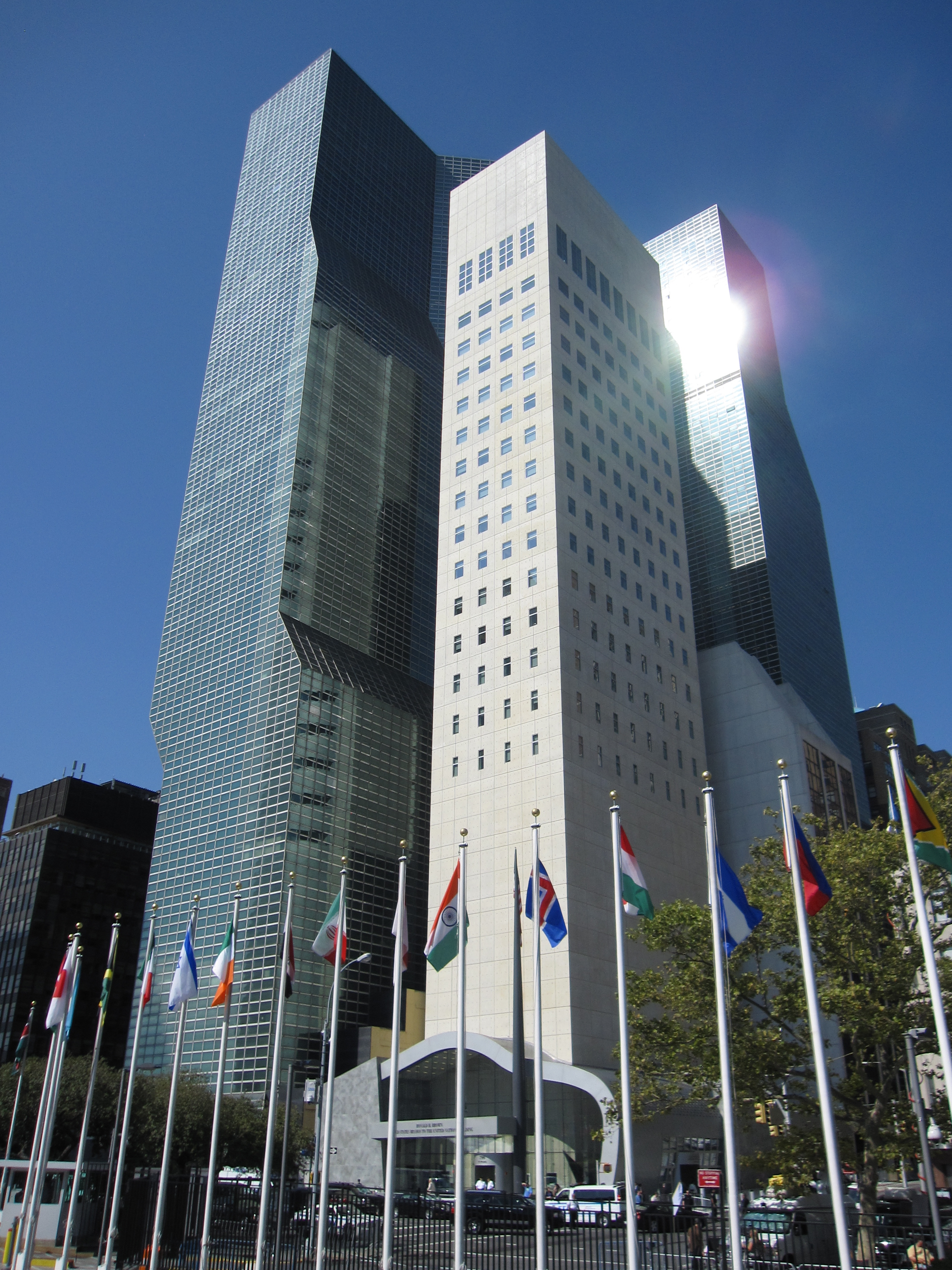
View of One and Two United Nations Plaza from the northeast. The white building in the foreground is the United States Mission to the United Nations.

The hotel hosted its first guests in early 1976, and it officially opened on June 8, 1976, as the United Nations Plaza Hotel. Due to a non-compete clause, Hyatt could not advertise the UN Plaza Hotel as being a Hyatt hotel, since the Hyatt brand was reserved for the nearby Grand Hyatt New York. When the hotel opened, nightly rates ranged from $37 for a studio-sized room to $300 for a large suite. The United Nations Plaza Hotel, along with the Park Lane Hotel, was one of the few luxury hotels built in New York City during the 1970s. At the time, the number of hotel rooms in New York City had consistently declined since the mid-1960s, even though room-occupancy rates in the city's hotels were increasing. Although One United Nations Plaza was not subject to property taxes, the city government received a $500,000 payment in lieu of taxes from the UNDC every year. The hotel charged an 8 percent sales tax to all guests, even diplomats, who typically were exempt from paying sales tax. It largely served diplomats and businessmen during weekdays, and it was particularly crowded during United Nations General Assembly meetings. The United Nations Plaza Hotel offered discounts to attract guests during weekends.

The hotel consistently recorded an annual profit during the first two decades of its operation. In 1980, to accommodate increasing demand for office space near the UN headquarters, the UNDC started constructing Two United Nations Plaza on 44th Street. The top 13 stories of the new building contained 198 rooms, of which 115 were suites. It was one of several projects that added 3,500 hotel rooms in New York City during the mid-1980s. Chemical Bank placed a $75 million construction loan on the structure, which ultimately cost $69.5 million to construct. Two United Nations Plaza opened in 1983. When the second tower opened, the rooms on the top 13 stories could be used either as short-term hotel rooms or as long-term residences; for instance, the studio apartments could be rented for $100 a night or $34,000 a year. The rooms were marketed to wealthy residents of foreign countries, as well as foreign corporations with staff in New York City.

The United Nations Plaza Hotel remained popular among diplomats and heads of state. During meetings at the UN headquarters, the hotel was so heavily guarded that a spokesperson said: "We have more security than guests." The hotel's staff often gave guests special treatment, fulfilling requests 24 hours a day. For example, after a delegate requested a rare liquor that was not available in the US, the staff arranged for a bottle of that liquor to be delivered from London. The staff maintained a "General Assembly Manual" in which they recorded diplomats' preferences, including diagrams of furniture layouts for delegates who visited multiple times. In 1990, the hotel was transferred to the Park Hyatt division and became the UN Plaza—A Park Hyatt Hotel. The same year, the hotel implemented additional programs and hired staff to attract foreign guests, and the proportion of European and Asian guests doubled. The hotel also hosted events such as fashion shows.

=== 1990s sales ===
During the early 1990s, the hotel's value declined to $30 million. The administration of mayor Rudolph W. Giuliani announced in May 1993 that it would sell the hotel in an attempt to reduce the city government's budget. The sale would include a partial stake in the underlying land, though neither building's office stories would be sold. Several city agencies and the Internal Revenue Service needed to approve the proposed sale. The Giuliani administration estimated that the city would earn $70 million to $90 million. The city government would have used $65 million of this amount to cover short-term debt, but the sale had not been finalized by early 1995. The sale was complicated by the fact that a private landlord owned one building, while the city government owned the other building and the land under both structures. Because of difficulties over the hotel's ownership, the Giuliani administration ultimately withdrew its offer to sell the hotel in 1995.

The Giuliani administration decided to place the building back on sale in February 1997. Occupancy rates in New York City hotels had increased because of an influx of tourism, and the Giuliani administration estimated that the sale of the hotel would generate $6 million per year in tax revenue. Hong Kong hotelier Regal Hotels International agreed in May to buy the property for $102 million, and the sale was finalized that July. The city government earned $85 million from the sale, and the hotel was renamed the Regal UN Plaza. At the time of Regal's acquisition, the hotel had an occupancy rate of 76 percent, slightly less than the citywide occupancy rate. By the late 1990s, Regal Hotels was facing financial issues and sought to sell off its hotels in the United States. Millennium & Copthorne Hotels agreed to buy Regal's U.S. hotels, including the UN Plaza, in November 1999.

=== Millennium ownership ===
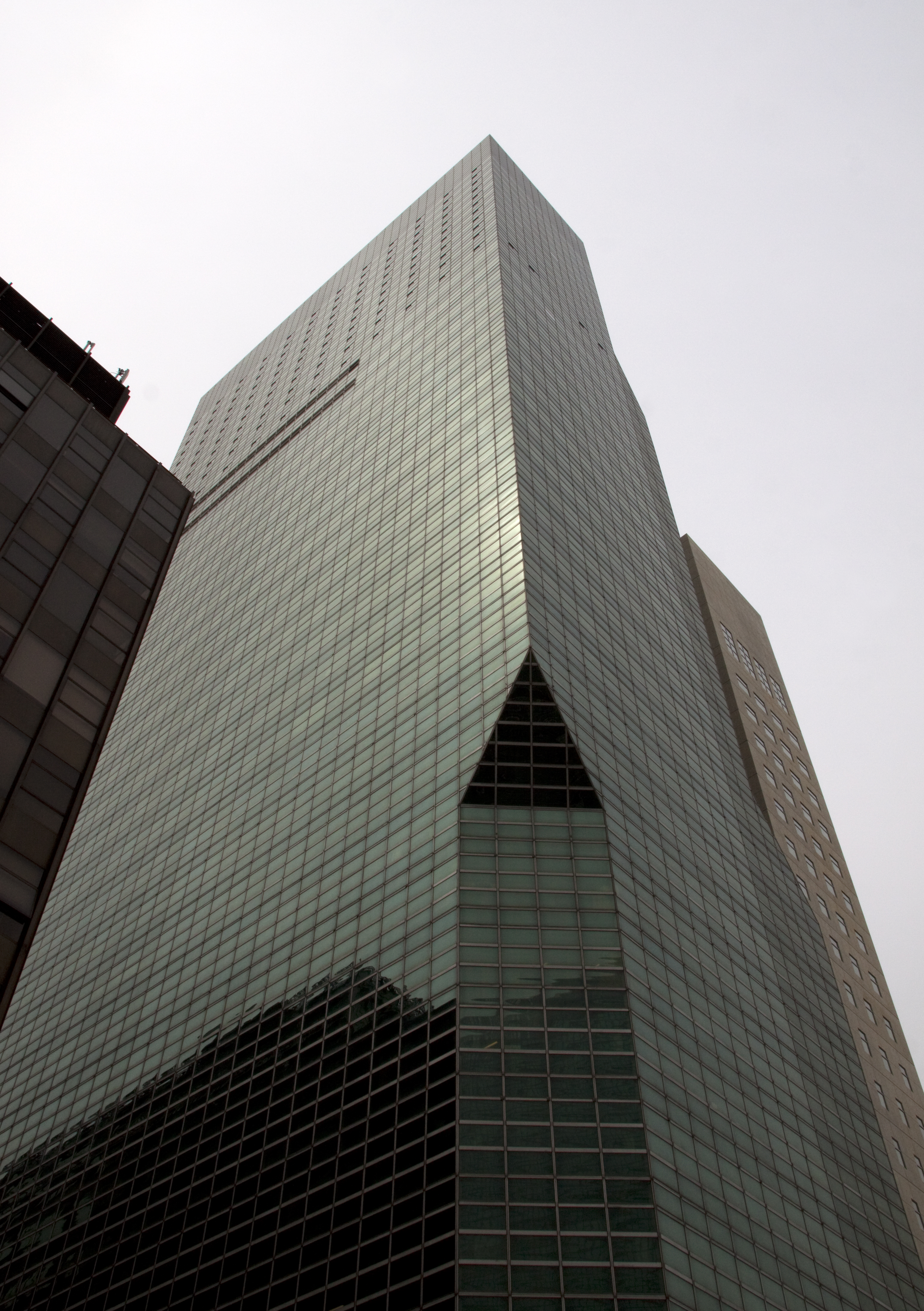
View of the southeast corner as seen from ground level

Millennium renamed the hotel the Millennium UN Plaza in April 2001, after they finished renovating the guest rooms. The Millennium UN Plaza continued to serve diplomats; it was especially crowded during September, when General Assembly meetings took place. The New York Times reported in 2003 that staff tended to dislike that week because heads of state tended to tip poorly and the staff were heavily monitored by the United States Secret Service and other security officials. About a quarter of the hotel's profit was directly related to business at the United Nations, and nightly room rates were typically raised during General Assembly meetings. According to the hotel's sales and marketing director, General Assembly meetings "set the tone for future business throughout the following year". By 2005, Millennium was converting some of the hotel rooms to condominium residences. The Ambassador Grill in the hotel closed for several years in the late 2000s.

Millennium announced in May 2012 that it would renovate the hotel in several phases. The first phase, which cost $30 million and was completed that September, entailed converting the rooms in Two UN Plaza into a luxury wing called the "West Tower". Millennium also planned to renovate the lobby and Ambassador Grill, covering or removing the mirrored walls there. The hotel was renamed the ONE UN New York Hotel in 2013, and Millennium announced plans to conduct a further renovation of the hotel in November 2015. Preservationists expressed concern that the renovations would result in the destruction of the public interior spaces, as the hotel operator had indicated its plan to redesign the Ambassador Grill. This led preservation group Docomomo International to request that the New York City Landmarks Preservation Commission (LPC) consider designating the hotel as an interior landmark. In September 2016, the LPC agreed to consider designating the public interior spaces of the United Nations Plaza Hotel as an interior landmark.

Millennium completed its renovation in November 2016 at a cost of $70 million. The LPC designated the Ambassador Grill and the majority of the hotel's lobby as New York City landmarks on January 15, 2017, describing the spaces as "important examples of Late Modern and Post-Modern design". At the time, the hotel was the youngest structure to be designated as a city landmark, having been completed between 34 and 42 years prior. The designation excluded the exteriors of the two buildings, as well as a seating area between the lobby's hallway and the Ambassador Grill. Representatives of Roche-Dinkeloo supported the landmark designation but questioned why the seating area had been excluded from consideration as a landmark. After Hilton Hotels & Resorts was contracted to manage the hotel in August 2017, the hotel was renamed Millennium Hilton New York One UN Plaza.

== Critical reception ==
=== Hotel ===
When the hotel opened in 1976, Paul Goldberger wrote that the hotel "manages exactly what the designers of the much‐publicized new Ritz Carlton in Chicago have been suggesting was impossible, namely the creation of a serious luxury hotel of entirely modern design." Ada Louise Huxtable said the United Nations Plaza Hotel's design features, such as its angled geometry and "luxurious and tasteful simplicity", collectively created a "rich, visual intricacy". Angela Taylor wrote for The New York Times that "the best things about the new United Nations Plaza Hotel are what it doesn't have", which included "canned music", a crowded ballroom, or paper tents for advertising. William Marlin of The Christian Science Monitor wrote that, despite the hotel's relatively low construction budget, "one can only be amazed at [the rooms'] quality and absorbing delight". In 1979, the New York City Club presented the United Nations Plaza Hotel with its Albert S. Bard Award for "excellence in building design".

Commentary continued in later years. Ned Zeman of The Washington Post described the hotel in 1993 as "modern, but not obnoxiously so, and it has a remarkable view of the East River". Two years later, Clara Hemphill wrote for Newsday that, while the mirrored public spaces were "not a study in quiet good taste", the UN Plaza was "a comfortable hotel with great views" because of how high it was. Conversely, hotel critic Grant Flowers described the lobby in 2001 as "the property's chief drawback", saying that it was "the definition of 1980s gaudy". The Journal of the American Institute of Architects wrote that "the sense of firm conviction about design so evident in the towers' exteriors seems somewhat shaken once one comes in from outdoors", and Robert A. M. Stern called the lobby "garish". In 2024, a writer for The Telegraph praised the views from the room; the fact that the site was relatively quiet but still near multiple points of interest; the large units; and the "scores of marble, mirrored surfaces and space galore".

=== Ambassador Grill and Bar ===
When the Ambassador Grill opened, New York Times food critic Mimi Sheraton reviewed the restaurant negatively, saying that "every appetizer came as overdressed as a drug store salad plate" and that the restaurant also offered "stale bread, banal cakes and erratic service". After foods from Gascony were added to the menu in 1986, Bryan Miller wrote for the Times: "Several of the Gascon dishes alone make a trip to the Ambassador Grill worthwhile."

In contrast to the mixed reviews of the cuisine, the Ambassador Grill was widely praised architecturally. Goldberger said the restaurant was "New York’s first good hotel dining room since the 1920s" and described it as the city's "most sensuous piece of modern design in a public place" since the Four Seasons Restaurant opened in 1958. According to Goldberger, the Ambassador Grill was a "far more intimate drinking place" in comparison to the "nobler" Four Seasons. Sheraton said the ceiling was "startling and somewhat wonderful" in spite of the quality of the food, while Miller said: "The subterranean dining room is striking with its interplay of dark walls, smoky glass panels and starry lighting." Robert A. M. Stern wrote in his book New York 1960 that the main hallway in the restaurant had "extraordinary reflections" and that the restaurant itself was a "spectacular setting".

== See also ==
- List of hotels in New York City
- List of New York City Designated Landmarks in Manhattan from 14th to 59th Streets
