= Kevin Roche =

Irish-born American architect (1922–2019)

Kevin Roche FAIA
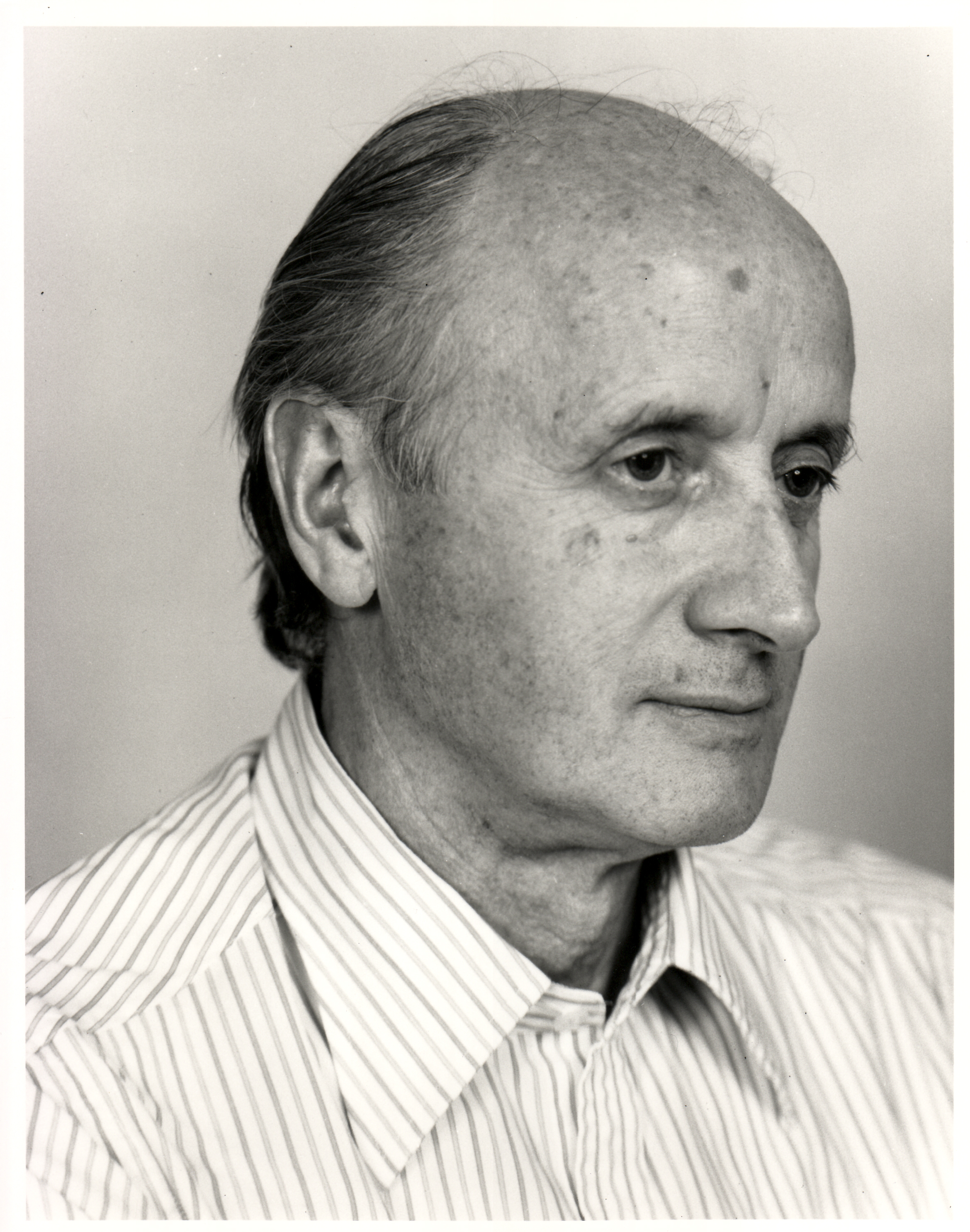
- Born: Eamonn Kevin Roche; June 14, 1922; Dublin, Ireland
- Died: March 1, 2019 (aged 96); Guilford, Connecticut, U.S.
- Education: University College Dublin; Illinois Institute of Technology
- Occupation: Architect
- Awards: AIA Gold Medal; Twenty-five Year Award; American Academy of Arts and Letters Gold Medals; Pritzker Prize
- Practice: Kevin Roche John Dinkeloo and Associates
- Buildings: Convention Centre Dublin; Head Office for Bouygues; Lafayette Tower; Shiodome City Center; U.S. Securities and Exchange Commission; Museum of Jewish Heritage; Santander Central Hispano; 1101 New York Avenue; Ford Foundation; John Deere World Headquarters; Metropolitan Museum of Art; Oakland Museum of California
- Website: Kevin Roche John Dinkeloo and Associates

Eamonn Kevin Roche (June 14, 1922 – March 1, 2019) was an American Pritzker Prize-winning architect. Kevin Roche was the archetypal modernist and "member of an elite group of third generation modernist architects — James Stirling, Jørn Utzon, and Robert Venturi — and is considered to be the most logical and systematic designer of the group. He and his partner John Dinkeloo of the firm KRJDA produced over a half-century of matchless creativity."

Roche and Dinkeloo were responsible for the design/master planning of over 200 built projects in both the U.S. and abroad. These projects include eight museums, 38 corporate headquarters, seven research facilities, performing arts centers, theaters, and campus buildings for six universities. In 1967 he created the master plan for the Metropolitan Museum of Art and thereafter designed all of the new wings and installation of many collections, including the reopened American and Islamic wings.

Born in Dublin and a graduate from University College Dublin, Roche went to the United States to study with Ludwig Mies van der Rohe at the Illinois Institute of Technology. In the U.S., he became the principal designer for Eero Saarinen and opened his own architectural firm in 1966.

Among other awards, Roche received the Pritzker in 1982, the Gold Medal Award from the American Academy of Arts and Letters in 1990, and the AIA Gold Medal in 1993.

== Biography ==
=== Early life ===
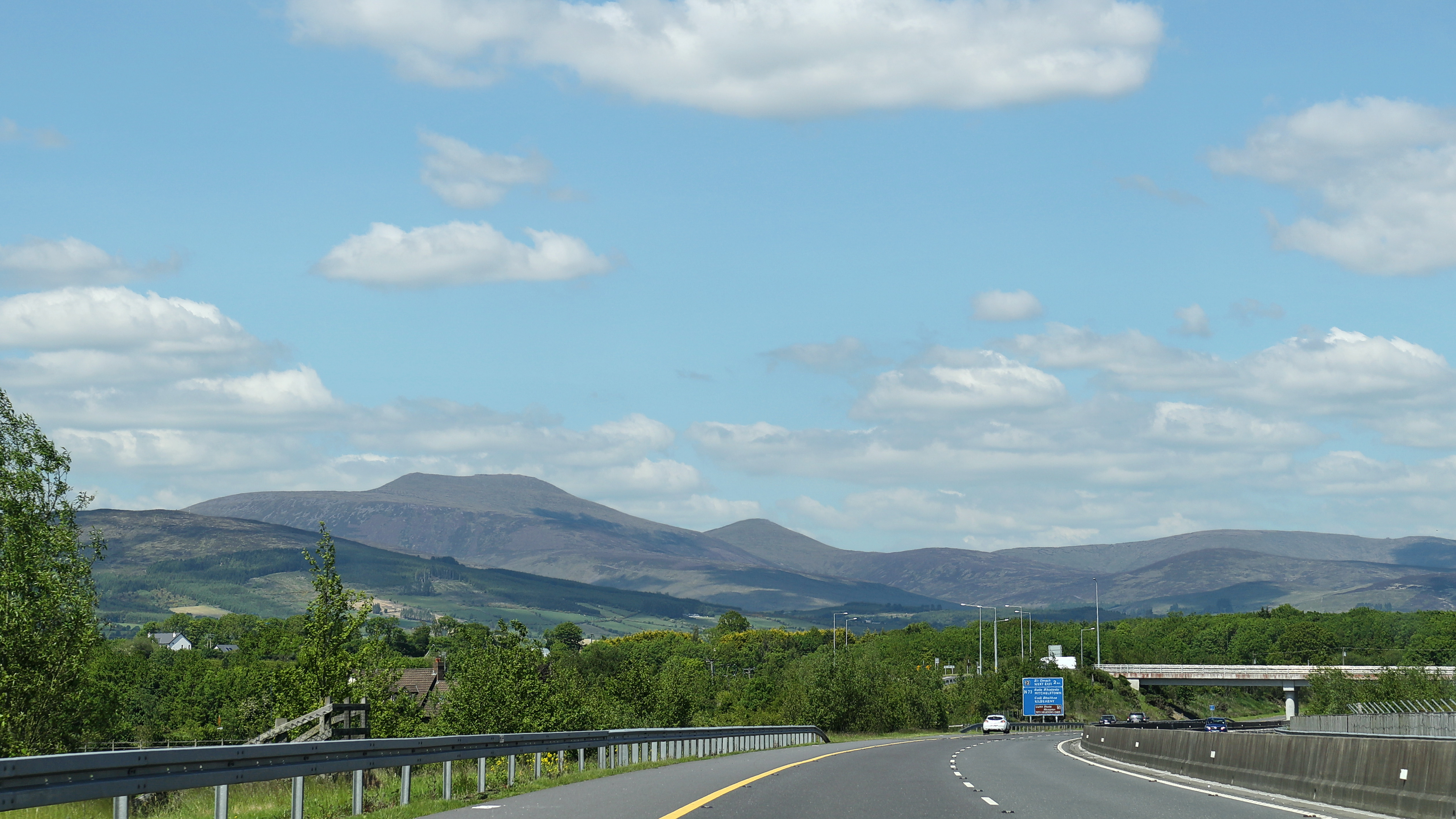
On the M8 with the Galty Mountains by Mitchelstown, County Cork

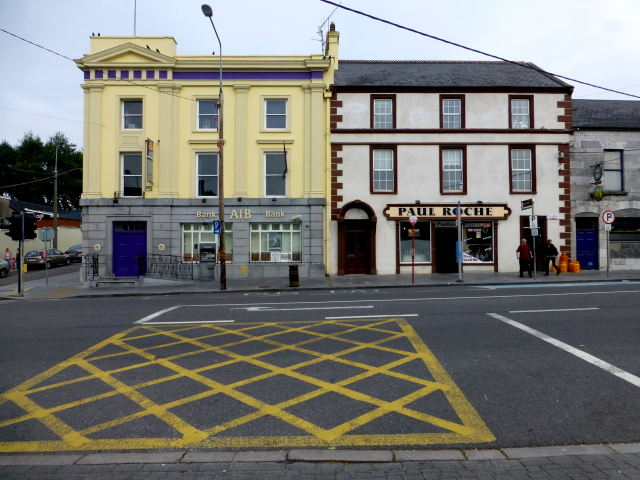
Main Street, Mitchelstown, County Cork

Roche was born in Dublin, Ireland, during one of the most tumultuous periods in Irish history: the Irish Civil War. Eamon Roche, Kevin's father, had been jailed twice for "revolutionary activities". Kevin was born during his father's second imprisonment. After Eamon was released from prison, he moved his family far away from war-torn Dublin to the pastoral hamlet of Mitchelstown in southwestern Ireland. Situated at the foothills of the Galtee Mountain Range, Roche's upbringing was anything but typical. It was forged by Eamon's keen managerial oversight of the Mitchelstown Dairy Co-operative in which Kevin worked alongside his father as dairy farmers. Eamon Roche successfully annexed all the surrounding dairy cooperatives, forging them into the largest in southwest Ireland. Later, the creamery was bought out by KerryGold Creamery.

Roche's life-changing moment came when his father asked him to design a warehouse to store the cheese that the dairy farms produced. Seeing his natural abilities unfold, Eamon enrolled the young Roche in a secondary school in Cashel, County Tipperary called Rockwell College. This is a well-known school in Ireland where Éamon de Valera, one of the Republic of Ireland's founding fathers, once taught mathematics. While Roche attended Rockwell College, his interest in architecture came about after reading a book by the English architect John Ruskin, The Seven Lamps of Architecture. He recalled that the book "was not the easiest to read but was very interesting".

=== University and early career ===
In 1940, Kevin returned to Dublin to continue his interest in architecture at University College of Dublin, or UCD. His first architectural drawing was of a pig enclosure composed of concrete blocks. Though initially trained in German Beaux Arts, this gave way to modernism and post-modernism interests. After graduating from UCD in 1945, Roche made the circuit with practically every well-known modernist of architecture: Michael Scott in Dublin from 1945 to 1946, Maxwell Fry in London from summer to fall of 1946, then Mies van der Rohe and Ludwig Hilberseimer at Illinois Institute of Technology in 1948.

After less than one year at IIT, Roche did not have enough money to continue for a second year. Since he could not receive his master's degree without funds, he instead thought of putting his architectural skills to practical use. In 1949, he moved to New York City and "badgered the UN Planning Office for a job". He was hired at the planning office for the United Nations Headquarters building in New York City. He began working on the United Nations complex at the firm of Harrison & Abramovitz and stayed on for eight months. During Christmas of 1950, he left to visit his family back in Ireland, but when he returned, his job had been eliminated.

Penniless and uncertain of his future in the United States, Roche contemplated returning home to Ireland. But an architect at the UN, sympathetic to his plight, recommended he call the firm of Saarinen, Swanson, and Associates, where the 83-year-old Eliel Saarinen still practiced in Bloomfield Hills, Michigan. The firm's famous father was complemented by the family's talent: second wife Loja, son (Eero), and daughter (Pipsan). The firm had said that Eero Saarinen would be going to New York to interview prospective candidates. After spending an evening at New York's famous Stork Club with a cousin from Ireland, Roche was unexpectedly called for an interview the following morning. Roche went to the interview, and as Saarinen was talking to him, Roche had fallen asleep. Roche recalls that Saarinen was still talking when he awoke, and was nonetheless hired. He moved to Michigan and began working for the firm, which had undergone a name change to be known as Eero Saarinen and Associates (ESA).

=== Eero Saarinen & Associates, Michigan ===
Roche at ESA, 1951

"The office was quite disorganised...so I fell into the role of taking over the projects and organising them."

— Kevin Roche – Architecture as Environment, Pelkonen 2011

After his father Eliel died, Eero Saarinen moved up to assume directorship. In 1950, Roche joined the firm. His future partner, John Dinkeloo (1918-1991), joined the firm in 1951 after he had left the architectural form of Skidmore, Owings & Merrill in Chicago. They became lifelong friends and business partners. There, Roche also met his future wife, Jane Claire Tuohy, with whom he eventually had five children. In 1954, he became the Principal Design Associate to Saarinen and assisted him on all projects from that time until Saarinen's death in September 1961.

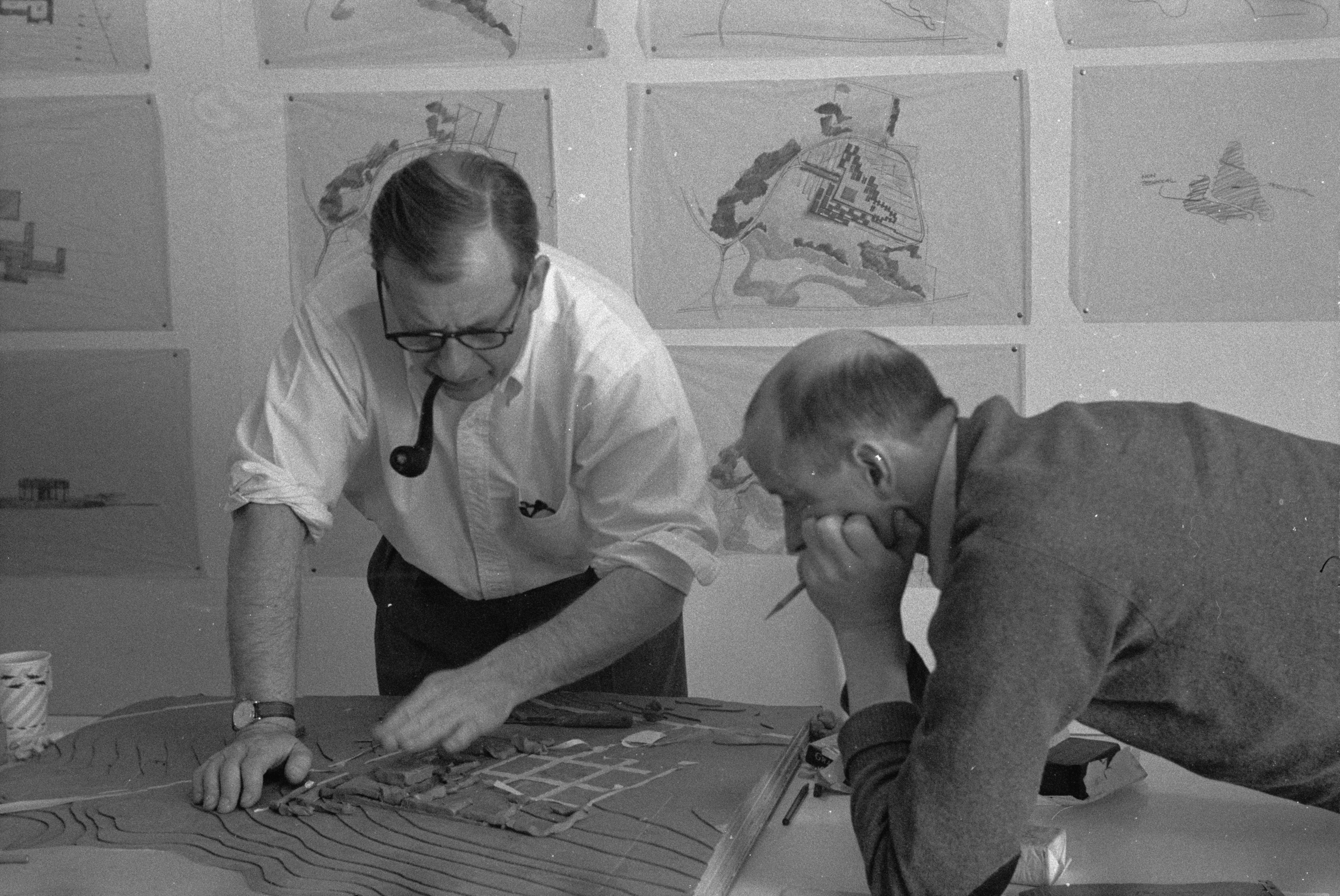
Roche (right) with Eero Saarinen in the 1950s

=== Kevin Roche John Dinkeloo and Associates ===
Later, Roche and Dinkeloo moved the practice to Hamden, Connecticut. Saarinen's firm morphed into Roche-Dinkeloo Associates or KRJDA. Today, the firm continues on as Roche Modern, where Roche's son, Eamon, is currently managing director. Thus, Roche and Dinkeloo laid the groundwork for the preeminent architectural firm which has been coined the "poster child architectural firm of corporate America".

In 1966, Roche and Dinkeloo formed Kevin Roche John Dinkeloo and Associates and completed Saarinen's projects. They completed twelve major unfinished Saarinen builds, including some of Saarinen's best-known work: the Gateway Arch in St. Louis, the expressionistic TWA Flight Center at JFK International Airport in New York City, Dulles International Airport Main Terminal outside Washington, D.C., the strictly modern John Deere Headquarters in Moline, Illinois, and the CBS Headquarters building in New York City.

Following this, Roche and Dinkeloo's first major commission was the Oakland Museum of California, a complex for the art, natural history, and cultural history of California with a design featuring interrelated terraces and roof gardens. The city was planning a monumental building to house natural history, technology, and art, and Roche provided a unique concept: a building that is a series of low-level concrete structures covering a four block area, on three levels, the terrace of each level forming the roof of the one below, i.e. a museum (in three sections) with a park on its roof. This kind of innovative solution went on to become Roche's trademark.

This project was followed by the equally highly acclaimed Ford Foundation Building in New York City, considered the first large-scale architectural building in the U.S. to devote a substantial portion of its space to horticultural pursuits. Its famous atrium was designed with the notion of having urban green-space accessible to all and is an early example of the application of environmental psychology in architecture. The building was recognized in 1968 by Architectural Record as "a new kind of urban space".

Kevin Roche

"Architecture is a local language and a universal language. Ultimately, a great building touches both, so that artist, and common man, understand it without being conscious of it. It is interwoven. That is great architecture."

— Kevin Roche, 1985

The acclaim that greeted the Oakland Museum and Ford Foundation earned Kevin Roche John Dinkeloo and Associates a ranking at the top of their profession. Shortly afterward they began a 40-year association with the Metropolitan Museum of Art in New York City, for which they did extensive remodeling and built many extensions to house new galleries including the one containing the Egyptian Temple of Dendur. Other high-profile commissions for the firm came from clients as varied as Wesleyan University, the United Nations, Cummins Engines, Union Carbide, The United States Post Office, and the Knights of Columbus.

In 1982, Kevin Roche became one of the first recipients of the Pritzker Prize, generally regarded as architecture's equivalent to the Nobel prize. Following this accolade, Roche's practice went global, receiving commissions for buildings in Paris, Madrid, Singapore, and Tokyo. He completed his first and only Irish project, The Convention Centre Dublin, in 2010.

Kevin Roche John Dinkeloo and Associates has designed numerous corporate headquarters, office buildings, banks, museums, art centers, and even part of the Bronx Zoo. Roche served as a trustee of the American Academy in Rome, president of the American Academy of Arts and Letters, a member of the National Academy of Design, and a member of the U.S. Commission of Fine Arts.

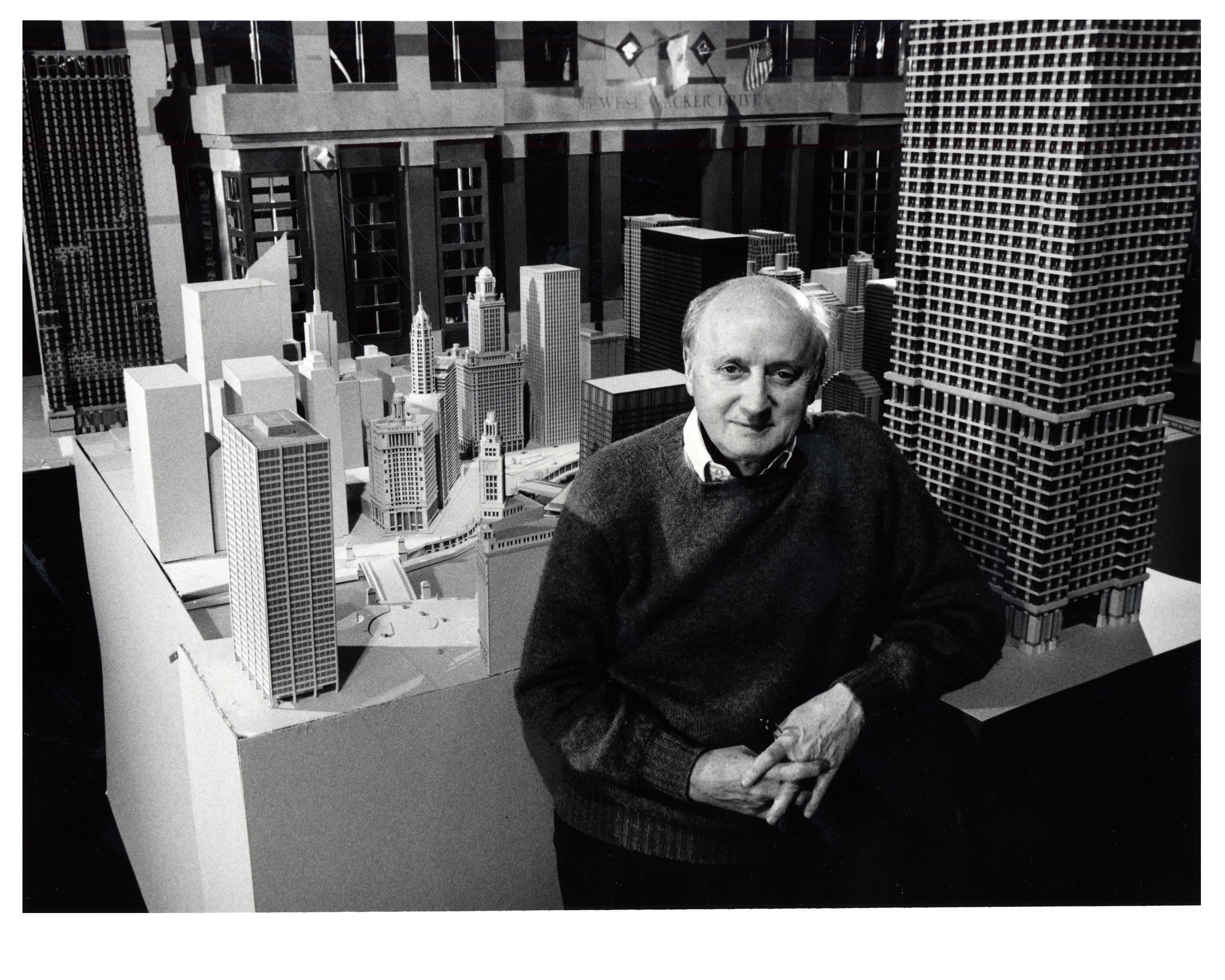
Roche in March 1989

Roche died on March 1, 2019, at his home in Guilford, Connecticut, aged 96.

== Prizes and awards ==
The work of Kevin Roche has been the subject of special exhibitions at the Museum of Modern Art, the Architectural Association of Ireland in Dublin, and the American Academy and Institute of Arts and Letters. A 2012 exhibition, Kevin Roche: Architecture as Environment, opened at the Yale School of Architecture in New Haven, Connecticut, and has been viewed at the Museum of the City of New York, the Building Museum in Washington, and the University of Toronto.

In addition to the Pritzker Prize, Roche was the recipient of numerous honors and awards including the American Institute of Architects Gold Medal Award, the American Academy of Arts and Letters Gold Medal Award for Architecture, and the French Academie d'Architecture Grand Gold Medal.

== Film ==
A feature documentary called Kevin Roche: The Quiet Architect was released in 2017. It was directed by Irish filmmaker (and former architecture student) Mark Noonan.

== Buildings ==
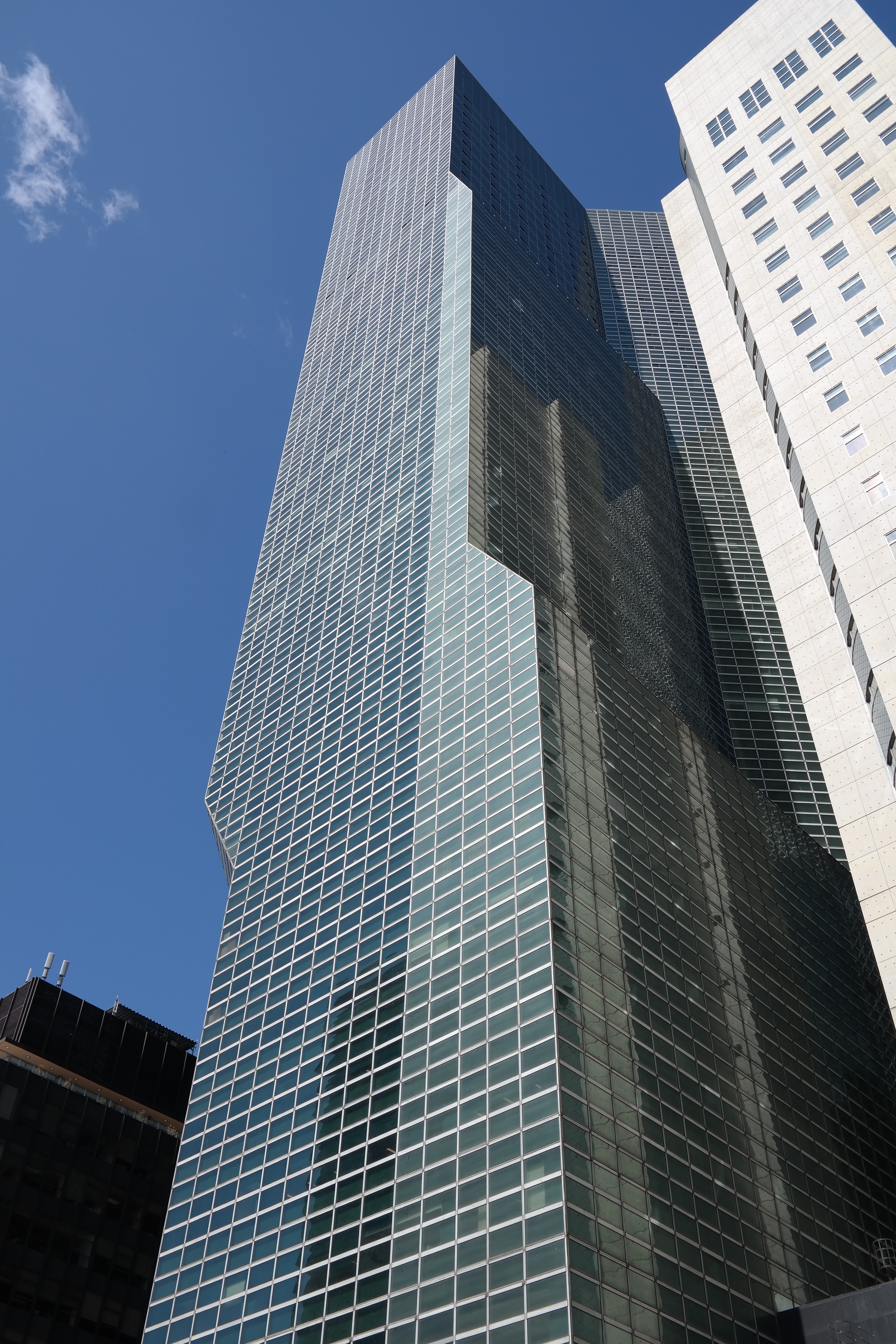
One UN Plaza depicting Roche-Dinkeloo's signature modernist design, showing chamfers or slant backs on northern and southern faces (1975)

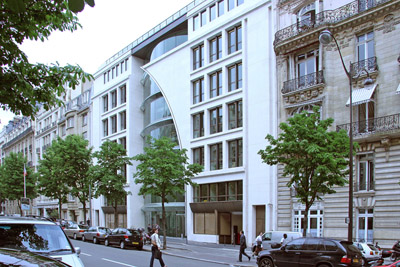
The Head Office for Bouygues SA Holding company received the "Haute Qualité Environnementale (HQE)", the highest certification for environmental quality in building design in France.

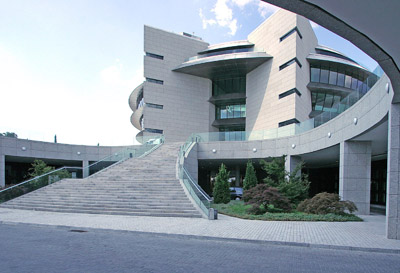
Headquarters for Santander Central Hispano in Madrid, Spain

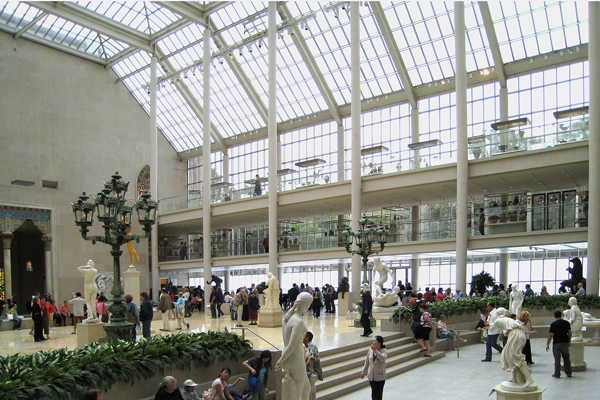
New American Wing for Twentieth Century Art at the Metropolitan Museum of Art

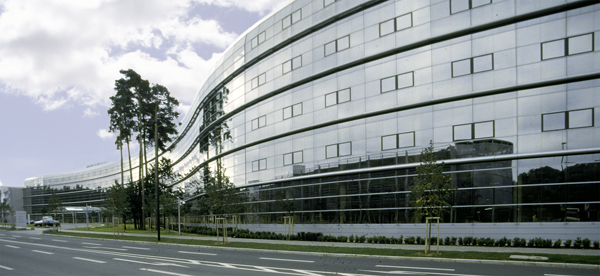
The continuous glass wall at Lucent Technologies in Nuremberg, Germany wraps around the complex to create a unified street facade.

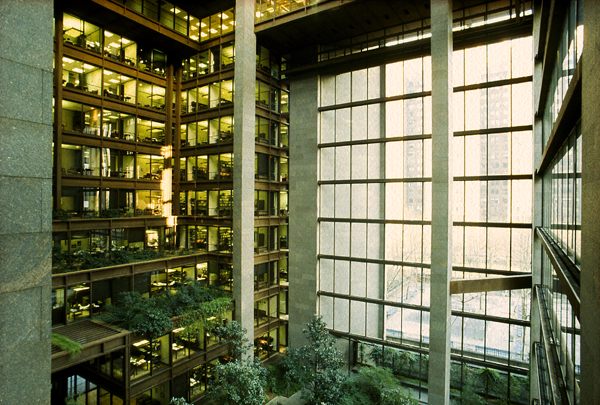
Ford Foundation Headquarters

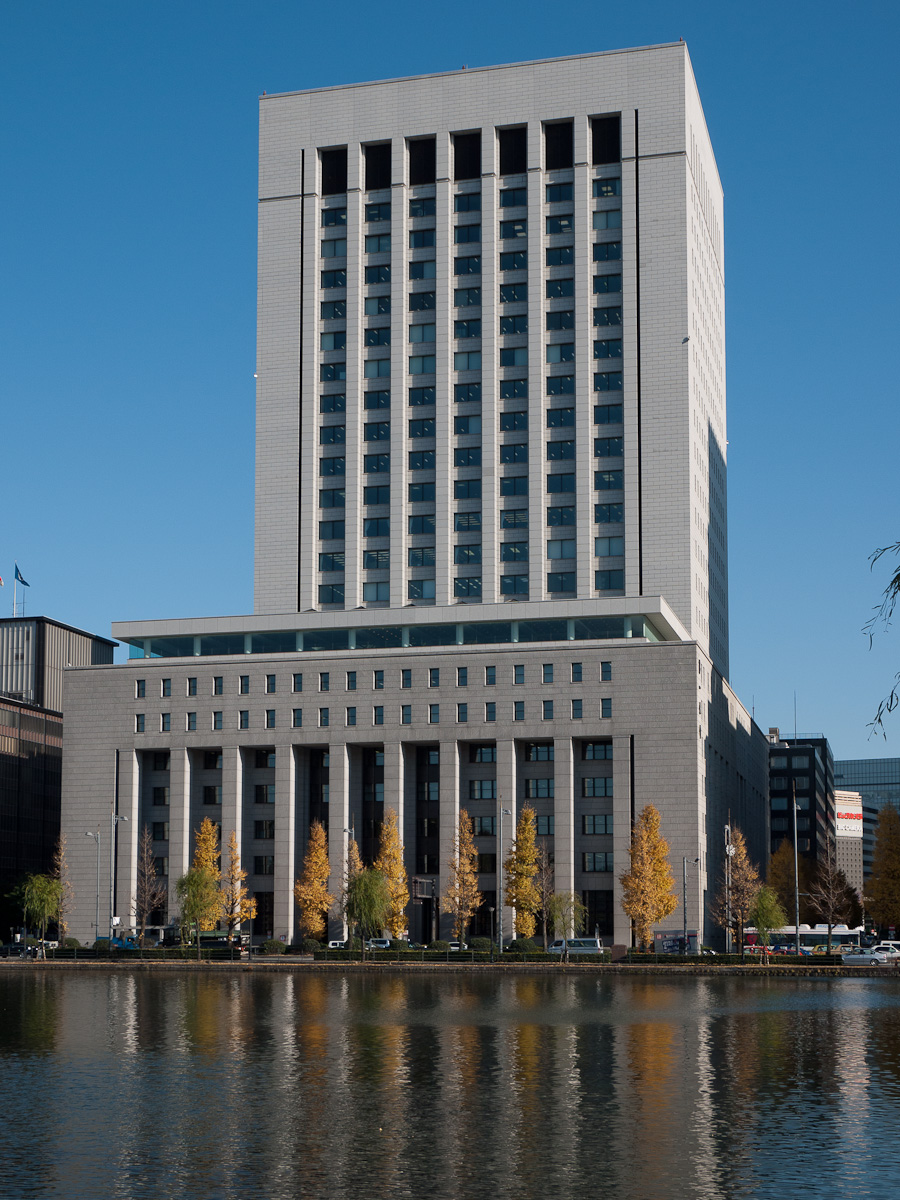
right The DN Tower 21 in Tokyo, Japan

- 1966 – Oakland Museum of California, Oakland, California
- 1968 – The Ford Foundation Building, New York, New York
- 1969 – Administration, Student Union & Physical Education Buildings, Rochester Institute of Technology, Rochester, New York
- 1969 – The Knights of Columbus Building Headquarters, New Haven, Connecticut
- 1969 – United States Post Office, Columbus, Indiana
- 1969 – Aetna Life and Casualty Company Computer Headquarters, Hartford, Connecticut
- 1971 – Power Center for the Performing Arts, University of Michigan, Ann Arbor, Michigan
- 1972 – Cummins Inc. Irwin Office Building Arcade, Columbus, Indiana
- 1972 – New Haven Coliseum, New Haven, Connecticut (closed 2002, demolished 2007)
- 1973 – Center for the Arts, Wesleyan University, Middletown, Connecticut
- 1973 – Cummins Midrange Engine Plant, Columbus, Indiana
- 1974 – Fine Arts Center, University of Massachusetts Amherst, Amherst, Massachusetts
- 1974 – Worcester County National Bank, Worcester, Massachusetts
- 1972 – The Pyramids, College Life Insurance Company of America headquarters, Indianapolis, Indiana
- 1975 - One United Nations Plaza New York, New York
- 1978 – John Deere World Headquarters, West Office Building, Moline, Illinois
- 1979 – Denver Performing Arts Complex, Denver, Colorado
- 1982 – The Corporate Center, Danbury, Connecticut (originally the Union Carbide Corporate Center)
- 1982 – Moudy Visual Arts and Communication Building, Texas Christian University, Fort Worth, Texas
- 1983 – Two United Nations Plaza, New York, New York
- 1983 – General Foods Corporate Headquarters, Ryebrook, New York
- 1983 – Cummins Corporate Office Building, Columbus, Indiana
- 1984 - Ravinia Complex, Atlanta, Georgia
- 1985 – Cummins Engine Company Corporate Headquarters, Columbus, Indiana
- 1985 – DeWitt Wallace Decorative Arts Museum, Williamsburg, Virginia
- 1986 – Conoco Inc. Petroleum Headquarters, Houston, Texas
- 1987 - Three United Nations Plaza New York, New York (UNICEF Headquarters)
- 1988 – Central Park Zoo, New York, New York
- 1988 – Bouygues World Headquarters, Saint-Quentin-Yvelines, France
- 1989 – Leo Burnett Building Company Headquarters, Chicago, Illinois
- 1990 – 750 7th Avenue, New York, New York
- 1990 – Metropolitano Office Building, Madrid, Spain
- 1992 – J. P. Morgan Headquarters, New York, New York
- 1993 – Corning Incorporated Corporate Headquarters, Corning, New York
- 1993 – Merck & Co. Inc. Headquarters, Whitehouse Station, New Jersey
- 1993 – NationsBank Building (now Bank of America Plaza), Atlanta, Georgia
- 1993 – UC Santa Cruz Scotts Valley Center, Scotts Valley, California
- 1993 – Tanjong and Binariang Headquarters/Menara Maxis, Kuala Lumpur, Malaysia
- 1994 – Pontiac Marina Millenia Tower and Ritz-Carlton Hotel, Singapore
- 1995 – Dai-ichi Life Headquarters/ Norinchukin Bank Headquarters, DN Tower 21, Tokyo, Japan
- 1996 – Cummins Columbus Engine Plant Expansion, Columbus, Indiana
- 1997 – Zesiger Sports and Fitness Center, Massachusetts Institute of Technology, Cambridge, Massachusetts
- 1997 – Shiodome City Center, Tokyo, Japan
- 1997 – Helen and Martin Kimmel Center for University Life/ Skirball Center for the Performing Arts, New York University, New York, New York
- 1997 – Lucent Technologies, Lisle, IL/Naperville, Illinois
- 1997 – Museum of Jewish Heritage, New York, New York
- 2000 – Ciudad Grupo Santander, Madrid, Spain
- 2001 – Securities and Exchange Commission Headquarters, Washington, D.C.
- 2002 – Bouygues SA Holding Company Headquarters, Paris, France
- 2003 – 1101 New York Avenue, Washington, D.C.
- 2003 – Renovation to Greek and Roman Court at Metropolitan Museum of Art, New York, New York
- 2005 – Lafayette Tower, Washington, D.C.
- 2007 – Renovation to American Museum of Natural History, New York, New York
- 2008 – Renovation to American Wing at Metropolitan Museum of Art, New York, New York
- 2009 – David S. Ingalls Rink Restoration and Addition, Yale University, New Haven, Connecticut
- 2010 – Convention Centre Dublin, Dublin, Ireland
- 2011 – Renovation to Islamic Wing at Metropolitan Museum of Art, New York, New York

== Awards and honors ==
Roche was the recipient of numerous honors and awards, including:

- Pritzker Prize
- American Institute of Architects – AIA Gold Medal
- American Academy of Arts and Letters Gold Medals – Gold Medal Award for Architecture
- Academie d'Architecture – Grand Gold Medal
- Total Design Award, American Society of Interior Designers
- Medal of Honor, New York Chapter of the AIA
- American Institute of Architects Twenty-five Year Award - for the Ford Foundation Headquarters
- Classical America's Arthur Ross Award
- Brendan Gill Prize of the Municipal Art Society of New York
- R. S. Reynolds Memorial Award
- New York State Award
- California Governor's Award for Excellence in Design
- Albert S. Bard First Honor Awards, City Club of New York
- Brandeis University Creative Arts Award in Architecture
- Brunner Award of the American Institute of Art and Letters
- New York Chapter American Institute of Architects Award

Honorary Degrees:

- Wesleyan University, Doctorate of Fine Arts
- National University of Ireland, Doctorate of Fine Arts
- Albertus Magnus College, Doctorate of Fine Arts
- Iona College, Doctorate of Fine Arts
- Yale University, Doctorate of Fine Arts
