= The Pyramids (Indianapolis) =

Office complex in Indianapolis, Indiana

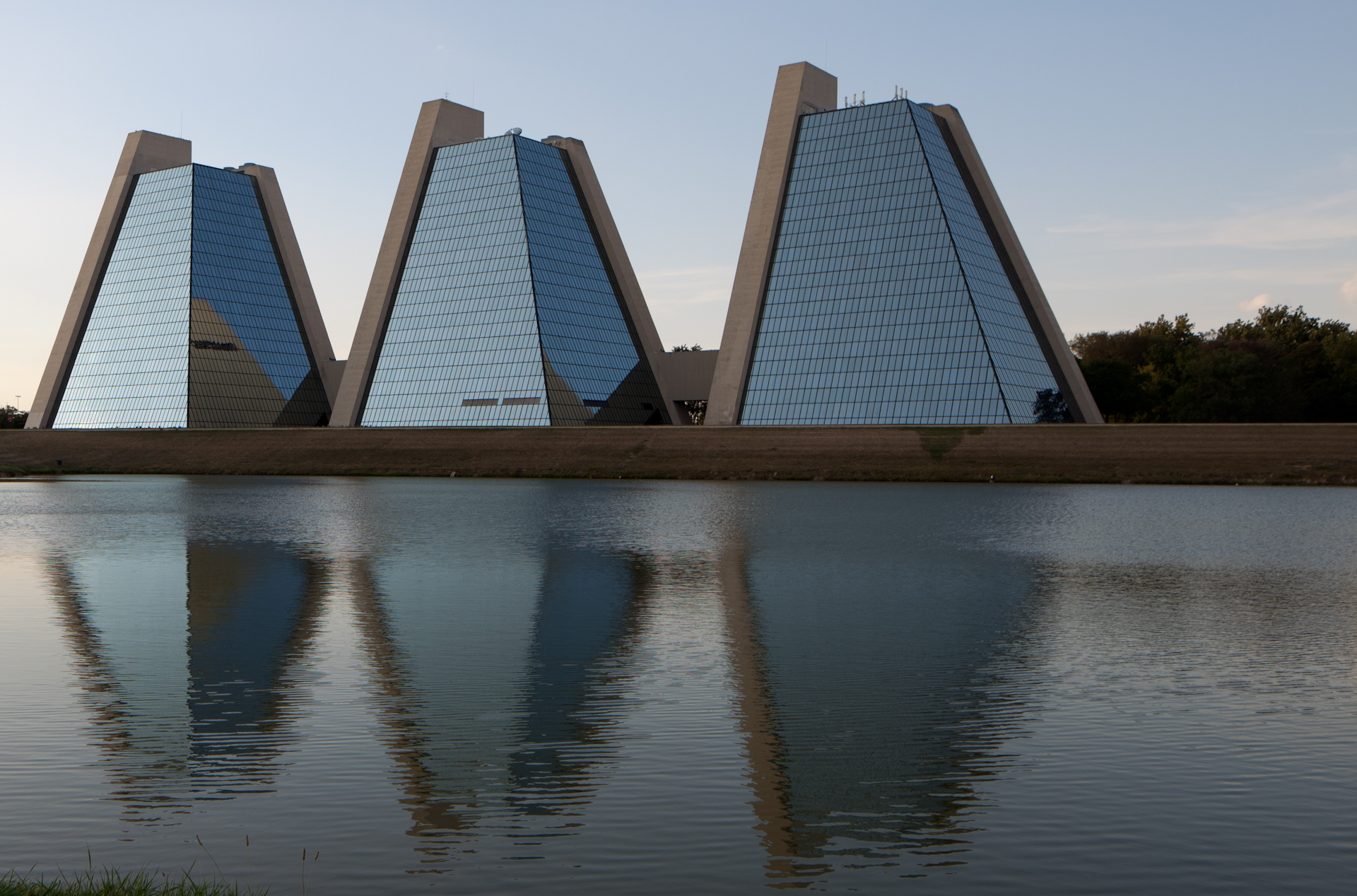
- The Pyramids in 2011, looking northwest

General information
- Type: Offices
- Location: 3500 Depauw Boulevard; Indianapolis, Indiana
- Coordinates: 39.9201°N 86.2209°W
- Completed: 1972
- Owner: KennMar LLC

Height
- Roof: 157 ft (48 m)

Technical details
- Floor count: 11
- Floor area: 366,704 square feet (34,000 m^{2})

Design and construction
- Architect(s): Roche-Dinkeloo and Associates LLC

Renovating team
- Architect(s): DKGR Architects

The Pyramids are three 11-story, pyramidal office buildings that are part of a 200-acre (810,000 m^{2}) commercial development in the College Park neighborhood of Indianapolis, Indiana, United States. The structures occupy 40 acres (16 hectares) next to a 25-acre (10-hectare) lake. They were constructed between 1967 and 1972 by the College Life Insurance Company (now part of Americo Life) using a design by architect Kevin Roche. They are noted for the abstract quality of the opacity of the concrete walls that face the nearby highway and the reflectivity of the glass curtain walls that face the landscaped grounds.

== History ==
In the 1960s, the College Life Insurance Company was rapidly expanding and sought to accommodate its growing staff while providing for anticipated expansion. It decided on a plan by Kevin Roche consisting of nine identical office towers each eleven stories tall and each containing 120,000 square feet (11,000 m^{2}). This would permit it to build towers as it needed additional office space without leaving buildings idle or underused. Only the initial three towers were constructed and took the form of pyramids. In the late-1990s, the site was re-landscaped and further construction of towers appeared unlikely. In 2004, Sterling American Property purchased the office center for US$10 million.

Since they were originally constructed, the College Life Insurance Company has left the buildings. Purchased in 2022, the property is owned by Speedway, Indiana-based KennMar LLC, which rents space to various businesses in the Indianapolis area. Soon after its acquisition, KennMar tapped DKGR Architects to lead a $12 million renovation of the complex. Interior design work included the removal of dropped ceilings and remodeling of the fitness center, conference center, elevator lobbies, and other public areas. Exterior work focused on restoring and recoating the buildings' reinforced concrete walls and improving landscaping.

The Pyramids are among Roche's most notable works and contributed to his being awarded the Pritzker Prize. In 2021, a six-person panel of American Institute of Architects (AIA) Indianapolis members identified The Pyramids among the ten most "architecturally significant" buildings completed in the city since World War II.

== Structure ==
Each tower is made up of two walls of reinforced concrete from which project the unobstructed office floors. Those concrete walls provide support for the floors as well as serving as L-shaped service cores, containing elevators, stairwells, and mechanical systems. The other two walls are covered in blue exterior glass and each building is connected to the others via underground and above-ground passages. Each pyramid has three cable passenger elevators. The buildings have been described as "abstract" and "sculptural" based on their use of opaque concrete walls facing Interstate 465 and reflective blue glass facing the interior lake of the complex.
