= 1101 New York Avenue =

Coordinates: 38.9002973°N 77.0274693°W

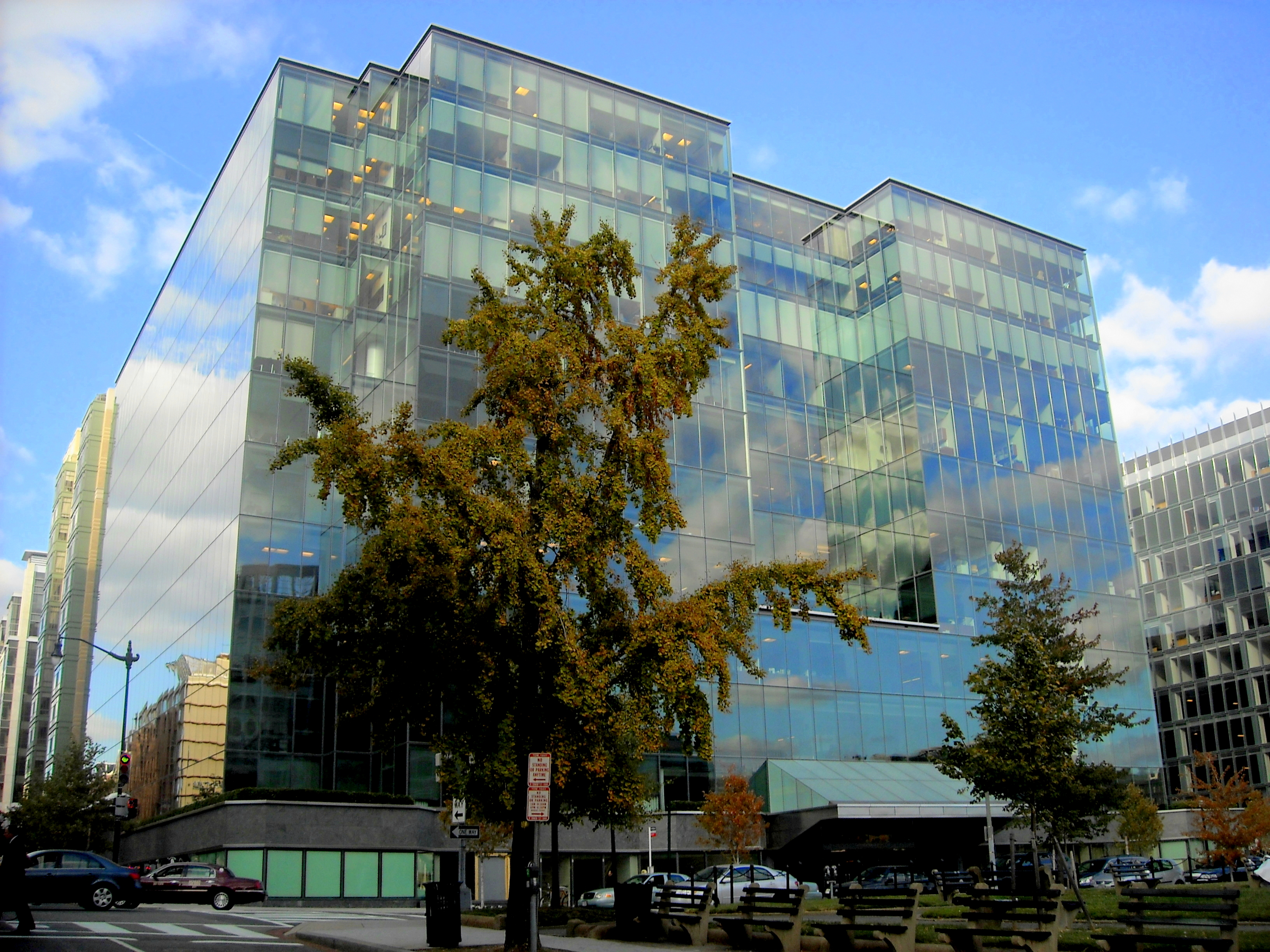
- Interactive map of the 1101 New York Avenue area

General information
- Type: Office
- Location: 1101 New York Avenue NW, Washington, D.C., United States
- Completed: 2007

Height
- Roof: 50 metres (160 ft)

Technical details
- Floor count: 12

Design and construction
- Architect: Kevin Roche

1101 New York Avenue is a high-rise building located in Washington, D.C., United States. Designed by architect Kevin Roche, its construction was completed in 2007. The glass clad structure rises to 50 metres (160 ft) and contains 12 floors totaling 380,000 square feet. The building was designed with notched corners to allow for more window offices. The building is tied for the 20th tallest building in Washington D.C.

The building houses Google's public policy offices., as well as the headquarters of the National Retail Federation (NRF). The building also houses an Ernst & Young office. The previous Global Chairman and CEO of Ernst & Young, Mark Weinberger was located at this office.

== See also ==
- List of tallest buildings in Washington, D.C.
