= 800 Westchester Avenue =

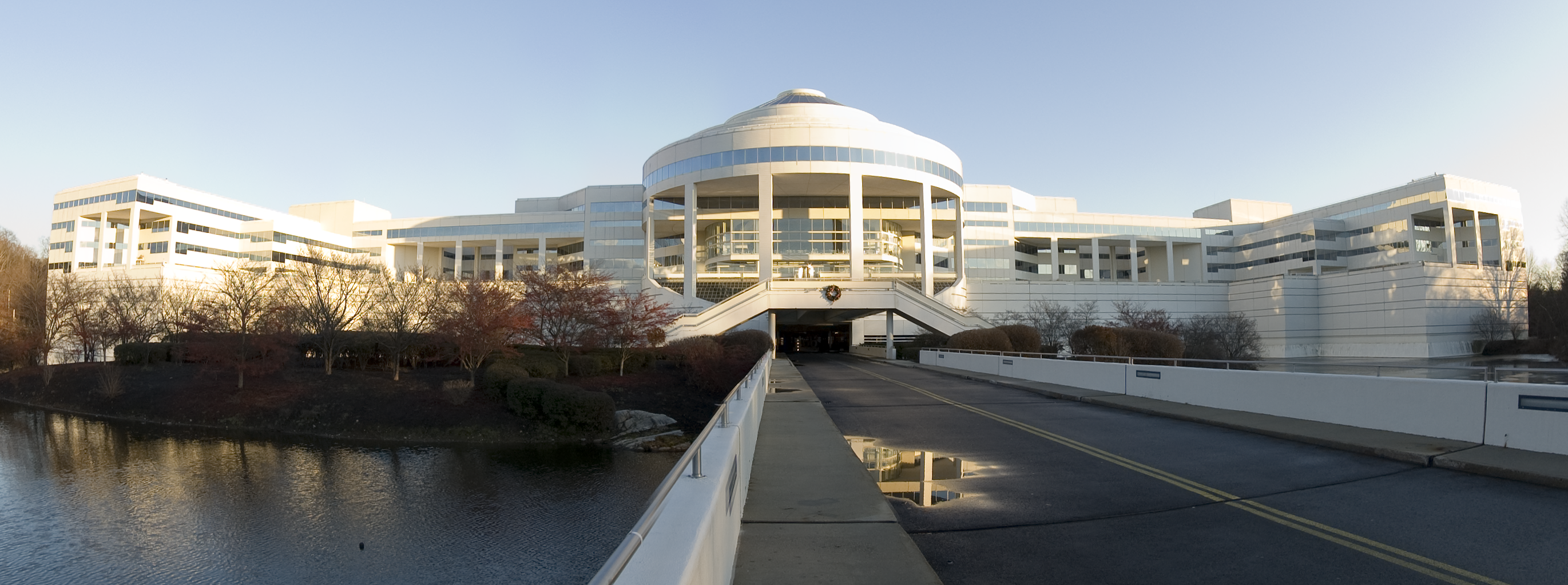
- Lake view of the building in 2008
- Interactive map of the 800 Westchester Avenue area
- Former names: General Foods Corporate Headquarters

General information
- Type: Corporate Offices
- Architectural style: Postmodern
- Location: Rye Brook, New York, 800 Westchester Avenue; Rye Brook, NY 10573
- Coordinates: 41.0066°N 73.6906°W
- Construction started: 1979
- Completed: 1983
- Inaugurated: July 1983
- Owner: RPW Group

Technical details
- Floor count: 7 (8 including 1,125 space underground parking facility)
- Floor area: 560,000

Design and construction
- Architects: Kevin Roche John Dinkeloo and Associates, LLC

The 800 Westchester Avenue complex is a postmodern Class A office building located in Rye Brook, New York. It was designed by the architectural firm of Kevin Roche John Dinkeloo and Associates, LLC to serve as the corporate headquarters for General Foods.

Described as an "aluminum business palace" and an "Aztec temple", it was also notable for being Westchester County's largest real estate transaction of 2004.

== History ==
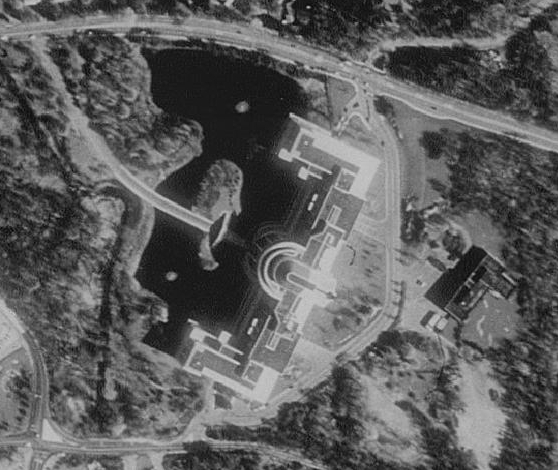
Aerial view, 1991

Originally conceived in 1979 by the General Foods company as a symbol of the firm's "aggressive consumer products packaging and marketing", it is known for its distinctive glass and white aluminum exterior. Upon its opening in 1983, General Foods relocated 2,000 headquarters staff from nearby White Plains. However, in 1985, General Foods was acquired by Philip Morris, which proceeded to lay off most of that location's employees in 1987. Then in 1989 General Foods merged with Kraft Foods Inc. to form "Kraft General Foods" where it remained in its White Plains headquarters until the mid 1990s when it moved to , Illinois.

After a series of subsequent mergers and restructurings, Altria, the successor to Philip Morris, sold off its remaining interest in the facility in 2004 to the IJNR Group headed by Robert Weisz, moving the remaining 1,000 employees to other facilities except for 6 essential employees who remain employed with RPW in Westchester County. At a cost of 40 million dollars, this was the largest real estate transaction in Westchester County in 2004 and did not include the 70 million dollar cost of renovating and subdividing the building.

== Facilities ==
The complex is noted for its extensive corporate amenities, and retains such features as a hair salon, barber shop, television studio, fitness center and conference facilities. These features were continued even after the sale and renovation of the complex as a value-added benefit to the significant number of new tenants who occupy spaces ranging from 1,500 to 120,000 square feet (11,000 m^{2}).

Also on-site is the related 760 Westchester Avenue facility that has been converted into a disaster recovery/adjunct location. It is currently leased by CBLPath Inc for an anatomic pathology services lab.

Currently, it is owned by the RPW Group and managed by Cushman and Wakefield.

== In media ==
The complex has also been featured in the USA Network drama Mr Robot Season 1 Episode 5 as the headquarters of the fictional company Steel Mountain, a data security company. Both interior and exterior scenes were shot on location including the data center and the executive cafeteria.
