= Leo Burnett Building =

Office skyscraper in Chicago, Illinois

Coordinates: 41.8864°N 87.6291°W

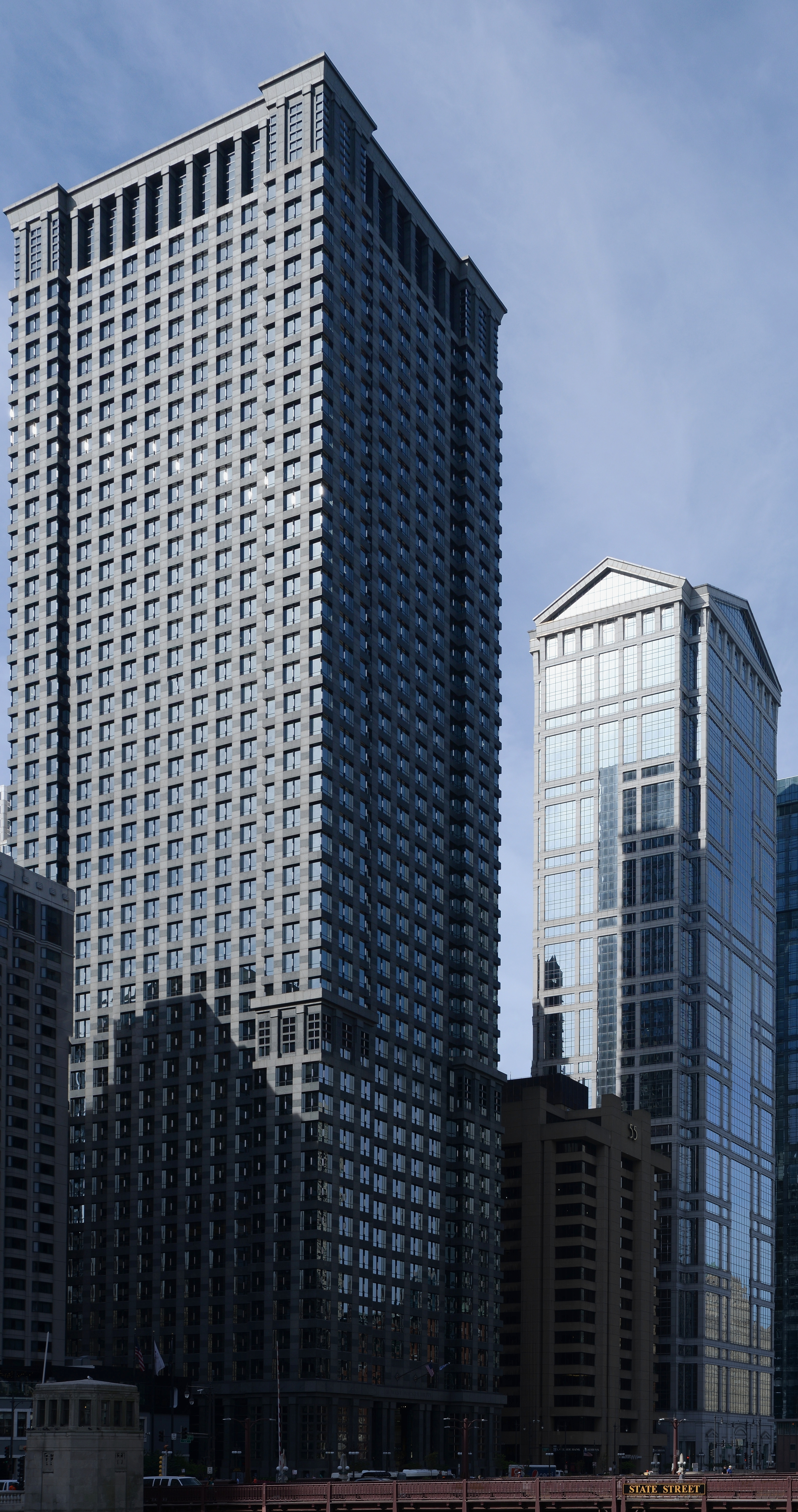
- The building from the Chicago river
- Interactive map of the Leo Burnett Building area

General information
- Location: Chicago, Illinois, 35 W Wacker Drive
- Completed: 1989

Height
- Height: 635 ft (194 m)

Technical details
- Floor count: 50

Design and construction
- Architect: Roche-Dinkeloo

The Leo Burnett Building, located on 35 West Wacker Drive at North Dearborn Street in the Chicago Loop, is a 50-story, 635 foot (193 m) tall skyscraper above the Chicago River's Main Stem on the southern bank. When built in 1989, it was the 12th tallest structure in Chicago. It was designed by Kevin Roche-John Dinkeloo and Associates and Shaw & Associates. It is a postmodern design made with granite, masonry, glass, steel and concrete. The windows are divided by stainless steel bars, which is typical of "Chicago windows."

== Tenants ==
It houses advertising agency Leo Burnett Worldwide, owned by Publicis, from which it derives its name. The building is also home to the law firm of Winston and Strawn. Media services agency Starcom Worldwide, also owned by Publicis, has its headquarters located in the building. RR Donnelley moved its corporate headquarters to this location in May 2015. Donnelly spinoff Donnelley Financial Solutions is also headquartered here. Publicis Media agencies Performics, Digitas and Spark Foundry moved into the building in 2018, as well as Publicis Sapient in 2019. Starbucks Coffee Company has housed a branch in the building for over two decades. Groupon relocated to this building from the Montgomery Ward Company Complex in 2023.

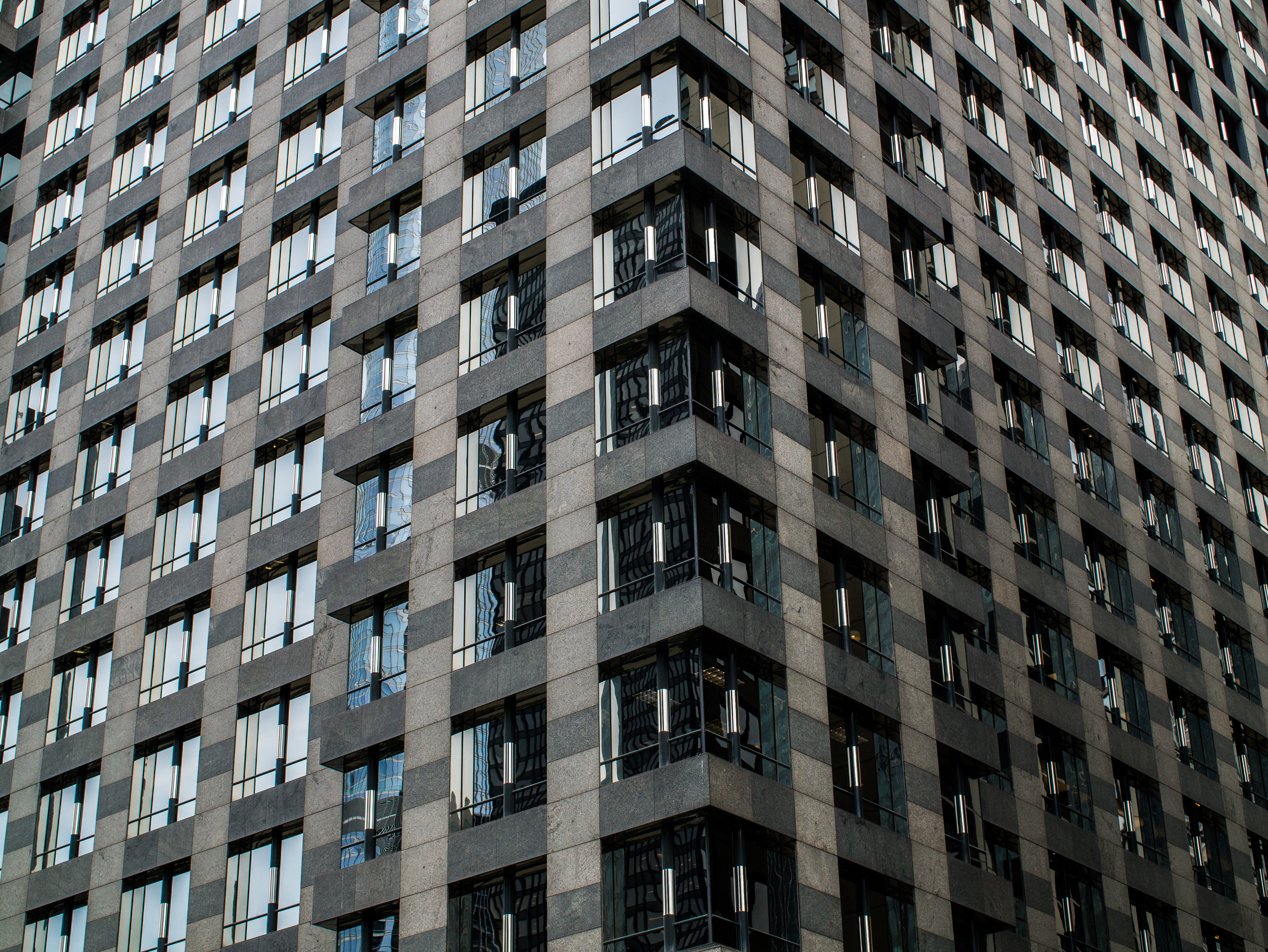
Leo Burnett Building detail

== Position in skyline ==
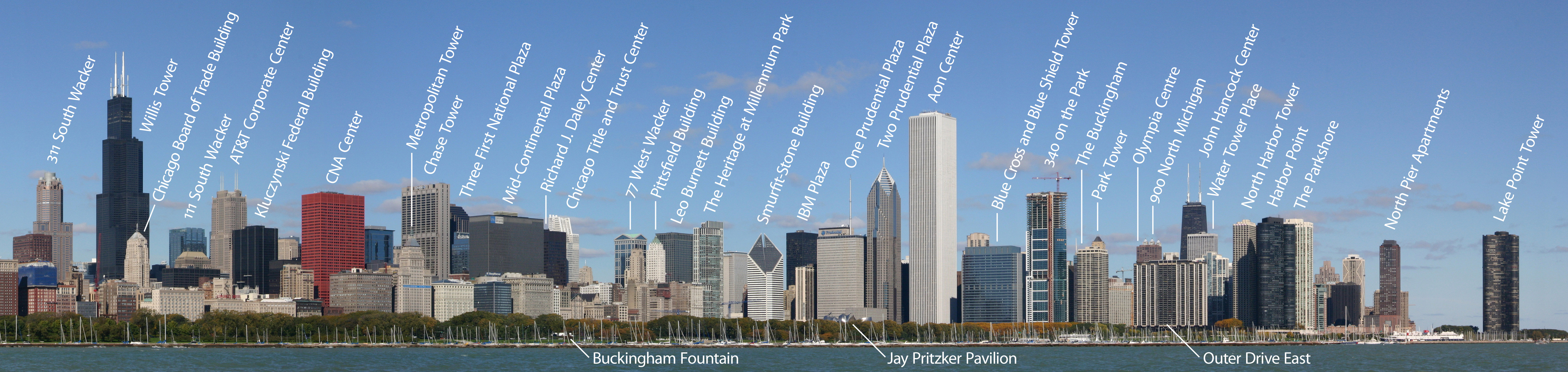
