= Zesiger Sports and Fitness Center =

Athletics facility in Massachusetts, US

Coordinates: 42.3587°N 71.0957°W

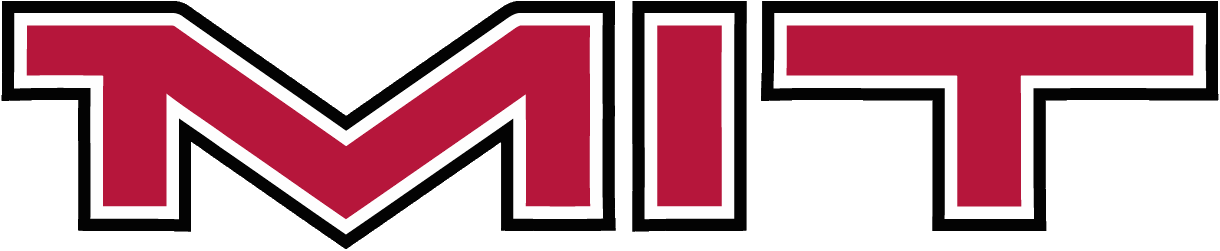

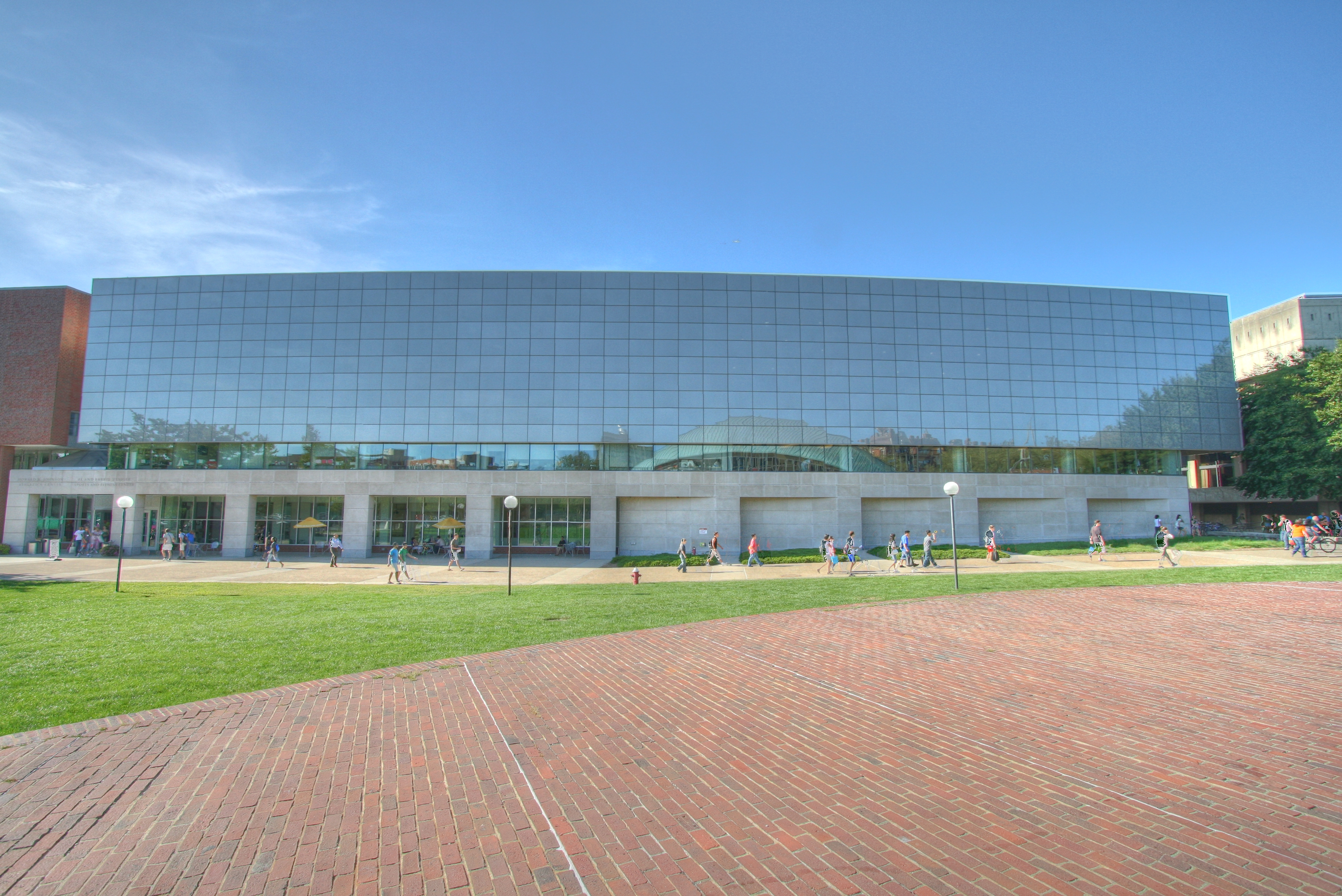
- Exterior view of the center in 2008
- Interactive map of Zesiger Sports and Fitness Center
- Full name: Al '51 & Barrie Zesiger Sports and Fitness Center
- Address: Cambridge, Massachusetts; United States
- Owner: MIT
- Operator: MIT Athletics
- Type: Sports venue
- Current use: Squash; Swimming; Water polo

Construction
- Opened: October 2002; 24 years ago

Tenants
- MIT Engineers (NCAA) teams: Squash; Swimming; Water polo

Website
- mitathletics.com/facilities

The Al and Barrie Zesiger Sports and Fitness Center (informally known as the "Z Center") is the central athletics facility at the Massachusetts Institute of Technology (MIT) since 2002. It is connected to Rockwell Cage, du Pont Gymnasium and the Johnson Athletic Center. MIT's Department of Athletics, Physical Education and Recreation (DAPER) administrative offices are also housed in the Z Center. It is 125,000 square feet (11,600 m^{2}) designed by Kevin Roche John Dinkeloo & Associates.

Facilities include:

- 50-meter lap pool
- 25-yard instructional pool
- Two fitness floors
- Multi-activity court
- 6 squash courts
- Massage suite and stretching and exercise spaces

== See also ==
Architecture of the Massachusetts Institute of Technology
