= John Deere World Headquarters =

Building complex in Moline, Illinois, US

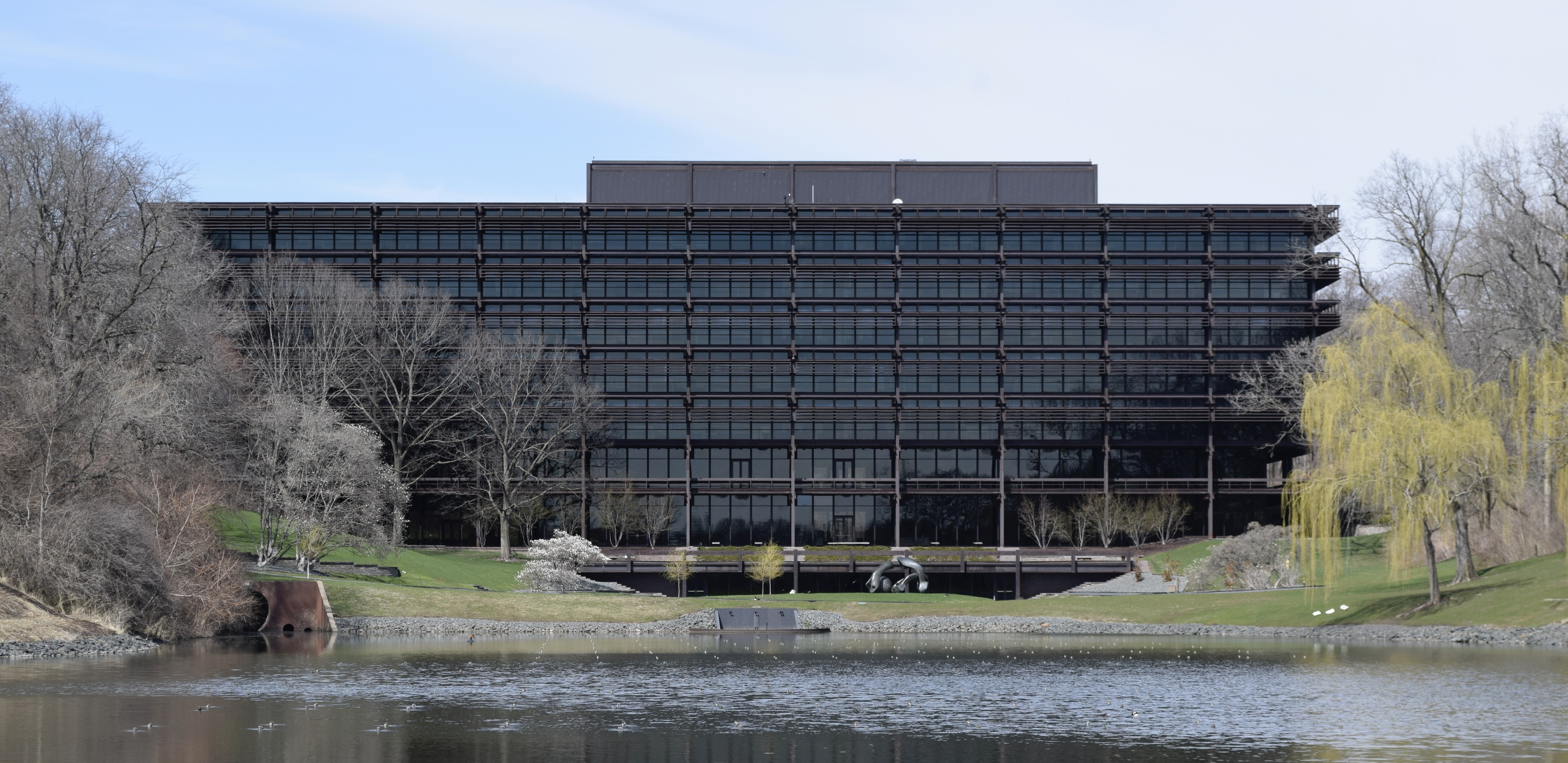
- View of the main building from the northern pond

General information
- Location: One John Deere Place, Moline, Illinois, United States
- Coordinates: 41°28′36″N 90°25′35″W
- Years built: 1961–1964 (original buildings); 1975–1979 (Deere West); 1979–1981 (Financial Services Building)
- Construction started: 1961
- Opened: April 20, 1964
- Owner: Deere & Co.

Technical details
- Floor count: 7 (main building); 2 (display building); 3 (Deere West); 4 (Financial Services Building)
- Grounds: 1,200 acres (490 ha)

Design and construction
- Architects: Eero Saarinen; Kevin Roche; John Dinkeloo; Sasaki Associates (landscape)
- Architecture firm: Saarinen Associates and Roche-Dinkeloo

The John Deere World Headquarters (or John Deere Administration Center) is the corporate headquarters for the agricultural equipment manufacturing company John Deere (also known as Deere & Co.) in Moline, Illinois, United States. The complex consists of four structures, three of which are interconnected. Eero Saarinen designed the original two structures, namely the main and display buildings. Roche-Dinkeloo, a firm founded by Saarinen's former associates Kevin Roche and John Dinkeloo, designed the Deere West office building next to the main building, along with the Financial Services Building on another part of the site. The landscape, designed by Sasaki Associates, includes two lakes.

The main building, display building, and Deere West are clad with Cor-Ten weathering steel and glass. The seven-story main building is located in a ravine and is accessed by footbridges on its fourth floor, which lead east to the display building and west to Deere West. The main building and Deere West both function as office structures; the offices in Deere West are arranged around a garden atrium with glass roofs. The display building contains an auditorium with two levels, along with a display area with a sculpture mural by Alexander Girard. The John Deere Headquarters received a large amount of attention from architectural critics when it was completed. It has also received numerous awards, including the Twenty-five Year Award for architectural excellence.

Plans for the complex were devised by William Hewitt, Deere & Co.'s chief executive officer, who began looking for an architect in 1956. Hewitt hired Saarinen, whose plans were approved in 1958; Saarinen died just after construction started in 1962. The complex opened on April 20, 1964, and included provisions for connections to additional buildings in the south and west. Roche-Dinkeloo was hired in 1975 to design Deere West, which opened in 1978. The Financial Services Building was constructed on a separate portion of the site between 1979 and 1981, away from the three older buildings. Following the completion of the four buildings, Deere & Co. continued to regularly host events and exhibits. By the 21st century, the complex was no longer open to the public, though it remained Deere & Co.'s headquarters.

== Site ==
The John Deere World Headquarters is located at One John Deere Place in Moline, Illinois, United States. The campus originally spanned 680 acres (280 ha) but over time was expanded to about 1,200 acres (490 ha). This plot was bisected by Coaltown Road (later John Deere Road), extending east to 10th Street, south to the Rock River, and north to about 1/2 mile (0.80 km) away from Coaltown Road. The building interiors are closed to the public, though the grounds are open seven days a week free of charge.

=== Landscape design ===
The landscape design was created by the landscape architecture firm Sasaki Associates, with Hideo Sasaki as the primary designer. The landscape, which includes various hills and ravines, differs from the minimalist modern-style landscape designs of other complexes such as the Illinois Institute of Technology Academic Campus. Over 4,800 shrubs and 1,100 trees were planted as part of Sasaki's landscape plan. The campus includes a series of forested ravines that divide the site into lowland and highland areas. The main building sits in the bottom of one such ravine between a pair of hills, facing the Rock River valley. A Japanese rock garden is located north of the main building and is surrounded by maples and dogwoods. In addition, an oak tree near the main building has a piece of Cor-Ten weathering steel, which bears an inscription honoring Saarinen.

The complex's main entrance is via a road that passes atop one side of the main-building ravine. The road is part of a 4-mile (6.4 km) system of driveways that traverse the complex; the placement of the roads was influenced in part by how the complex's buildings appeared from the road. The roads connect with 30 acres (12 ha) of parking lots, which are not visible from the buildings.

Two lakes sit just south of the main building, spanning a combined 4 acres (1.6 ha). The larger lake, to the south, has one hundred water jets. The lake has an island with a cast of Henry Moore's sculpture Hill Arches, the base of which is covered with sod, making the sculpture appear like it was floating. The larger lake provides cooled water that is piped into the complex's air-conditioning system, which is activated when temperatures exceeded 85 °F (29 °C). The water in the larger lake could also be used to extinguish fires if necessary, and the lake hosted several swans and a flock of Canada geese. The smaller lake, to the north, has Japanese carp and is fed by a stream that flows through the main-building ravine. During storms, water drains into the Rock River to the south.

== Architecture ==
The main architect of the two original buildings was Eero Saarinen & Associates; after Saarinen's death in 1961, his associates Kevin Roche and John Dinkeloo oversaw their completion. Ammann & Whitney was the structural engineer, Burns & McDonnell was the complex's mechanical engineer, and Huber, Hunt & Nichols was the general contractor. The project employed several other consultants, including acoustical consultant Bolt Beranek & Newman and lighting designer Richard Kelly. Saarinen personally designed most of the furniture, including desks with built-in telephones. Some chairs were designed by Saarinen's associates Charles Eames and Warren Platner. Roche-Dinkeloo, the successor firm to Saarinen & Associates, designed the Deere West annex in 1978, for which Turner Construction was the main contractor. Roche-Dinkeloo also designed the Financial Services Building.

Because of the complex's unconventional design, tax assessors had difficulty appraising its value for taxation purposes. Joseph Lacy, a partner at Saarinen's firm, described the complex as having been "definitely designed for the people who are using it".

=== Exterior ===
The main building is seven stories high; (Note: This is the height given by multiple sources, while others cite a conflicting figure of eight stories.) this height was necessitated by the narrowness of the ravine. It measures 330 by 96 feet (101 by 29 m) across. The display building, east of the main building, is a two-story structure measuring 90 by 210 feet (27 by 64 m) across, with a roof 35 feet (11 m) high. Deere West, the office building west of the main building, is three stories high, while the Financial Services Building is four stories high.

==== Facade ====
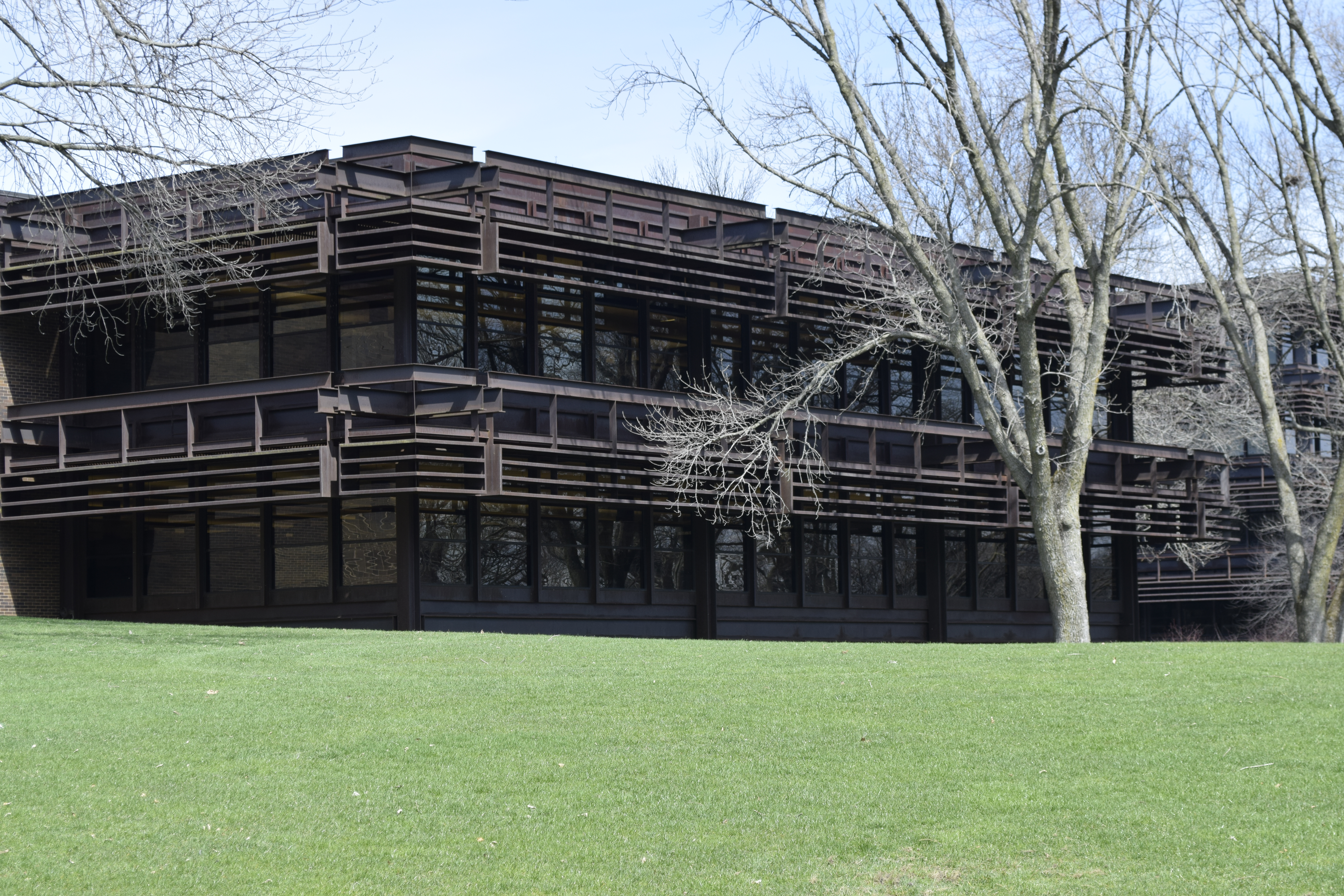
The Cor-Ten grilles on the outside of the west office building

The facades include some of the first architectural applications of Cor-Ten weathering steel, (Note: It is sometimes cited as the first-ever architectural use of Cor-ten steel. Some transmission towers in the eastern US used Cor-ten steel before the John Deere Headquarters was built.) and they were the first non-industrial buildings in the US to use that material. The first two buildings include 2,050 short tons (1,830 long tons; 1,860 t) of Cor-Ten steel and 994 short tons (888 long tons; 902 t) of other types of steel. The weathering steel was left exposed, in contrast to buildings in cities, where Cor-Ten steel was sometimes required to be insulated. The Cor-Ten steel oxidized into a brown color as it aged; the oxidation gives the buildings a natural look, since the color matches that of the adjacent trees. The beams were left unpainted because it took only a few years for the steel to oxidize, and they did not corrode further once they had oxidized. The facade has louvers (also described as sunshades) to reduce sunlight glare while also allowing the building's occupants to see outside. There are vertical steel uprights between each floor. The ground story, containing the executive offices, is surrounded by a grilled balcony.

The windows of the main building are made of three types of glass. The lower two floors use clear glass, as the facade on these stories is shaded by deep overhangs. The upper stories use reflective glass, which reflects 62% of light and 53% of solar heat. There is also one window near the lake that uses frosted glass. The windows are also tinted to further reduce glare, and each window is embedded into the Cor-Ten steel frame using neoprene gaskets. Both the gaskets and the tinted glass were variants of similar features that Saarinen's firm had previously designed for other buildings. More specifically, the tinted glass had been used on one wall of the Bell Labs Holmdel Complex, while the gaskets had been used at the General Motors Technical Center. The spandrel panels between each story are made of glass and are placed between metal panels on different floors.

The auditorium of the display building, has brick walls without windows, while the rest of the display building has a similar Cor-Ten and glass facade to the main building. Deere West has a Cor-Ten and glass facade, similar to the original building. Deere West's facade is interrupted at four locations to create the impression that the building is composed of multiple pavilions, and it also has visible brick sections. The Financial Services Building has a facade of aluminum siding, set within a steel frame. Though modern in style, the facade has some architectural features that are adaptations of similar details in classical buildings, including pediments and columns. The building has pillars that rise above the roofline, creating a trellis that hides mechanical areas on the roof from view. The facade is interspersed with horizontal bands of silver, reflective-glass windows.

==== Footbridges ====
The main building's entrance is through a glass-and-steel footbridge on the eastern side of the main building's fourth floor, which connects with the display building. The footbridge runs perpendicularly to the complex's access road. The presence of the eastern footbridge allowed the main building to stand isolated on the ravine's floor, without any pathways leading to it at ground level. When the main building was completed, there were plans for another footbridge leading west to additional offices; this bridge was eventually constructed in 1978. The western footbridge leads from the main building's fourth floor to Deere West's second floor, bending slightly to intersect with Deere West's main entrance.

=== Interior ===
==== Main building ====
Inside, the main building spans about 297,000 square feet (27,600 m^{2}). (Note: Some sources give a more precise area of 297,132 square feet (27,604.5 m^{2}).) Unlike in traditional buildings where the executive offices are on the top floor, the John Deere main building's executive offices are on the lower floors. There are also two basement levels with mechanical spaces and a clinic. The first floor contains a 556-seat cafeteria, which, because of the site's remoteness, was the only place to eat on campus. A private 70-seat executive dining room abuts the lake and is set slightly below the waterline of the lake. The lower stories also have a gallery where Grant Wood's paintings are displayed. On the second floor are the executive offices, which run along the perimeter of the building; the secretaries' desks are placed in the center of that floor. Due to the presence of the facade's louvers, Saarinen did not install curtains or Venetian blinds.

The upper stories have other offices and assorted conference rooms, with the offices placed along the perimeter. On typical floors, the north and south sides are divided into bays measuring 30 feet (9.1 m) wide. The interior spaces are divided into a grid of 3 by 6 feet (0.91 m × 1.83 m) rectangles. On the north and south sides of each floor are bays extending 42 feet (13 m) from the facade; the center bay contains a hallway measuring 12 feet (3.7 m) across, for a total north–south width of 96 feet (29 m). These bays are delineated by parallel pairs of steel columns. There are no partitions except around the central hallway and at the mechanical core on the north side of the building. Ducts and wires are concealed within a cable running down the central bay. The building is heated by two gas-fired boilers, each with a capability of 747 horsepower (557 kW), and it is cooled by a 1,600-short-ton (1,400-long-ton; 1,500 t) plant that uses water from the larger lake.

The floor tiles are made of white vinyl, measuring half the width of the windows, and thin stanchions with telephones rise from the floor tiles. The interiors incorporate large amounts of glass. When the complex was completed, some of the interior glass partitions were engraved with names or Deere & Co.'s logo to prevent people from accidentally walking into the partitions. In contrast to many typical American office buildings, the John Deere Headquarters did not have luminous ceilings or metal-and-plastic surfaces; instead, the ceilings have lighting fixtures with egg crate–shaped grilles. The architects focused on the color of small details, ordering dark cabinet labels and repainting typewriters to match the building's overall color scheme.

==== Display building ====
The display building, which contains an auditorium and a display area, covers about 53,000 square feet (4,900 m^{2}). (Note: The auditorium and display area occupy the same building and have areas of 30,000 square feet (2,800 m^{2}) and 23,000 square feet (2,100 m^{2}); sources disagree on which one is larger. The Rock Island Argus cites the display area as being larger, while The Christian Science Monitor and Bachman 2004 cite the auditorium as being larger. Bachman gives a more precise area of 30,311 square feet (2,816.0 m^{2}) for the auditorium but notes that the display area covers precisely 23,000 square feet (2,100 m^{2}).) The auditorium, according to one source, acted as "part of the entry sequence for visitors" given its proximity to the entrance. There are 384 or 387 seats, spread across an orchestra level and a balcony level. The balcony has four interconnected tiers, but unlike in traditional auditoriums, the higher tiers are protruded further forward than the lower tiers. This was done to create a more intimate feeling for spectators on the upper tiers, since they were closer to the stage than they would have been in typical auditoriums, and they could look directly down at products on the stage. The auditorium also has a simultaneous interpretation system with headphone jacks, along with a stage that contains a 32-foot-diameter (9.8 m) turntable.

Adjoining the auditorium is the display area, which has a second-floor mezzanine connecting with the footbridge to the main building. This mezzanine overlooks a ground-floor exhibition space. A sculpture mural by Alexander Girard is tucked under the mezzanine. The mural consists of more than two thousand 19th- and 20th-century objects, including newspapers, antique toys, and pieces of farm equipment. The mural measures 180 feet (55 m) long by 8 feet (2.4 m) tall, (Note: Other sources cite conflicting lengths of 100 feet (30 m) or 125 feet (38 m).) being divided into two 90-foot-wide (27 m) sections; it is placed behind a glass wall.

==== Deere West ====
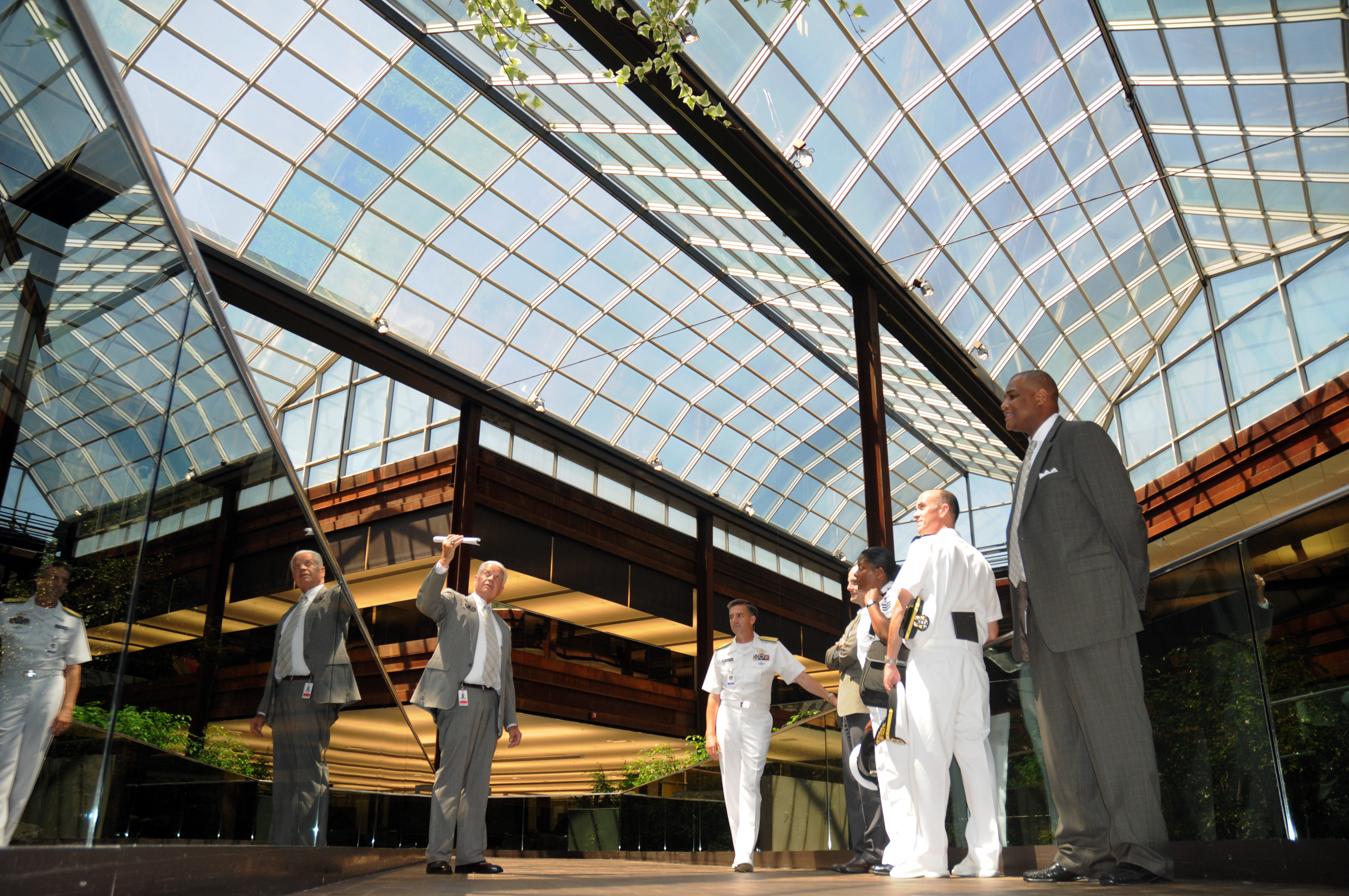
A Naval Sea Systems Command engineer tours Deere West in 2009

Deere West includes offices arranged around a large glass-roofed atrium, which has a total area of 200,000 square feet (19,000 m^{2}) and includes an 11,000-square-foot (1,000 m^{2}) garden on its floor. The garden contains large iron ore rocks from Missouri, which were so heavy that a portable crane was used to place them in the building. There are also plants such as coffee and weeping fig trees. Roche was responsible for the arrangement and selection of these plantings, and a greenhouse was built in another part of the complex to grow replacements for these plants. An overpass with glass parapets, connecting with the western footbridge, crosses the atrium garden. Granite paths wind through the garden itself. To avoid introducing invasive species, workers could not bring their own plants into the building. In addition, Deere & Co.'s gardeners used bugs rather than pesticides, which would permeate the surrounding offices.

There is a cafeteria at atrium level, which has seating for about 300 people. The walls contain a variety of colorful hand-woven tapestries, along with movable catwalks to assist with the atrium's maintenance. The building has intersecting gambrel roofs; the glass roofs let in sunlight, reducing the need for artificial light during the day. The west–east roof is located above a walkway, which leads to a footbridge to the main building, while the north–south roof is located above the atrium garden. The glass roofs are not covered with sun shades.

Deere West's interior design is more abstract than that of the original building. The offices surround the atrium on all sides, and the partitions separating different offices rise only partway to the ceiling. The workspaces have tan carpets, sound-absorbing furnishings, and white noise machines. The ceilings lack direct lighting, and the spaces are instead illuminated by lamps recessed into the partitions, as well as indirectly by mirrored panels that reflect sunlight from the atrium. They are decorated with pieces from John Deere's art collection. Roche-Dinkeloo had previously created a similar office-and-atrium arrangement in New York's Ford Foundation Building. Whereas the Ford Foundation offices and atrium are physically separated by windows and sliding doors, the Deere & Co. offices have open-air balconies directly overlooking the atrium. When it was built, Deere West had a library and art storage area.

==== Financial Services Building ====
The offices in the Financial Services Building are arranged in a similar way to those at Deere West, with half-height partitions between the offices. The first floor has mechanical spaces, a dining room, a kitchen, and training rooms. There are offices on the other three floors. The offices are oriented to maximize sunlight exposure during the day. Like Deere West, the Financial Services Building lacks ceiling lights, instead being illuminated indirectly by mirrored panels and directly by sunlight coming through windows.

=== Art collection ===
The headquarters houses the company's art collection, which has gradually grown since 1964 or 1965. The collection encompasses a wide range of work, including prehistoric objects, modern art, and drawings by young artists in countries where John Deere sold equipment. A Dispatch article from 1979 cited the collection as including carved Indonesian deer, tapestries, African prayer scrolls, and Middle Eastern tools. Relatively few of the collection's artworks are rare or valuable pieces. Among the more notable pieces are Girard's mural, a cast of Henry Moore's sculpture Hill Arches, and Grant Wood's painting Fall Plowing. Other artists with work in the collection include Alexander Calder, Marc Chagall, Henri de Toulouse-Lautrec, Joan Miró, Alejandro Obregón, Fritz Scholder, and Ulfert Wilke. None of the works have labels identifying them, and when the buildings were open to the public, the art was seldom displayed.

The collection originally consisted of pieces that Deere & Co. chairman William Hewitt and his wife acquired on their trips during his tenure as chairman. Hewitt continued to acquire art, consulting with dealers and architects worldwide. With the construction of Deere West in 1979, about 100 smaller and 20 larger art pieces were installed in that building, many of them being fabric hangings. Subsequent chairmen continued to expand the collection. The pieces in the art collection were the only decorations in the buildings, as employees could not bring memorabilia such as pictures or diagrams. Hewitt originally made the final decisions on where every piece of art would be installed. By 2000, the collection had 1,600 works, which were managed by two curators. The Dispatch wrote in 2009 that around 1,000 pieces were located at the headquarters, while a 2015 article from The Rock Island Argus cited the headquarters as containing 10% of the company's 3,000 art pieces.

== History ==
The complex was originally called the Deere & Co. Administrative Center but was known by the 21st century as the John Deere World Headquarters. Before the current headquarters was built, the agricultural-equipment corporation Deere & Co. had been located in Moline, Illinois, since 1847. (Note: Merkel 2005, p. 95, cites a different date of 1843.) The headquarters had occupied the same building in downtown Moline since 1870; that building had been expanded several times over the years. Deere & Co. moved some employees to an office building on River Drive nearby in 1955, and it brought additional departments to another building in 1958. William Hewitt, who became Deere & Co.'s chief executive in the mid-1950s, wanted an architecturally significant headquarters and wanted to consolidate employees who worked in several other office buildings around Moline. This contrasted with the company's existing buildings, which tended to be utilitarian and designed by in-house staff.

=== Development ===
==== Architect and site selection ====
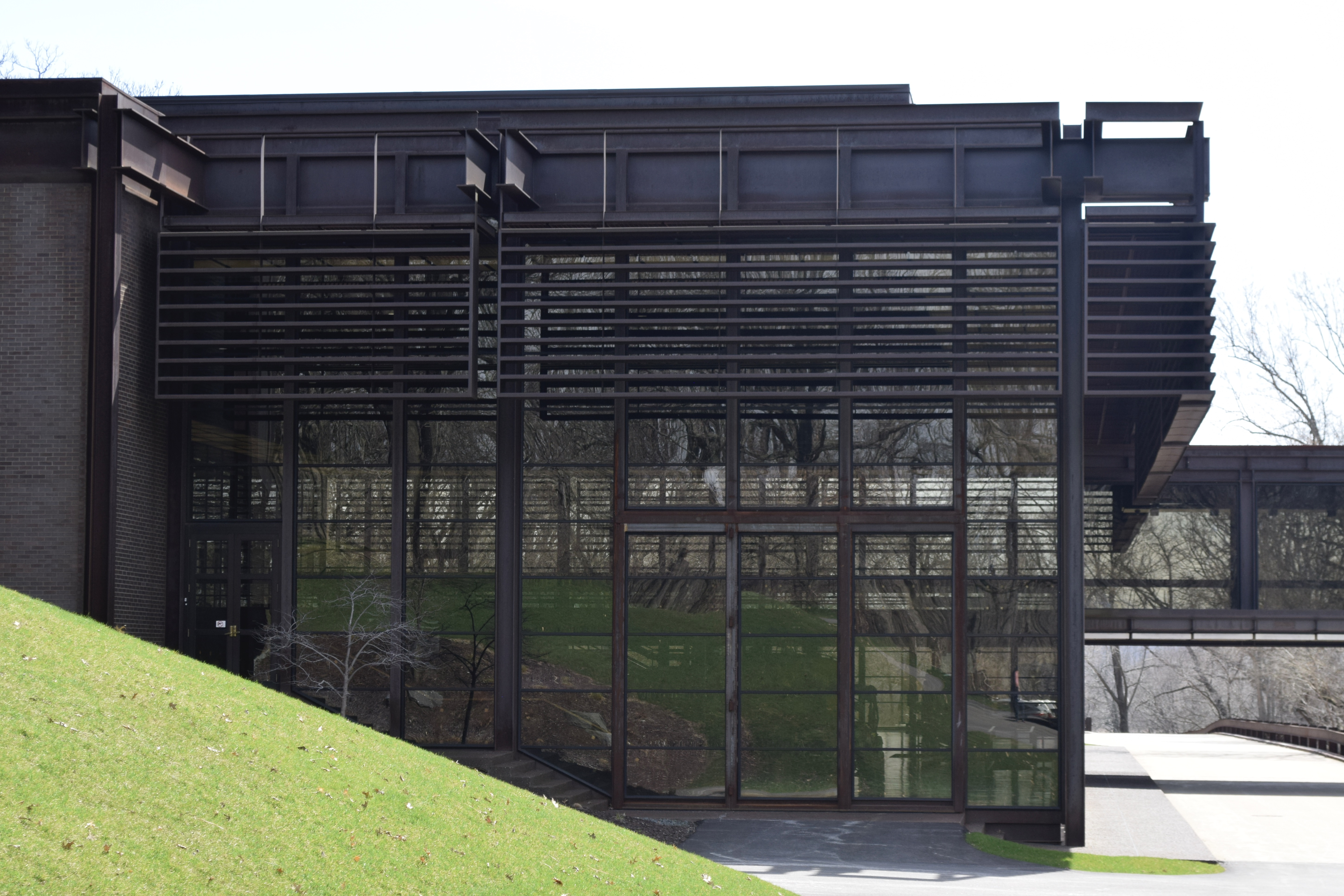
Profile of display building

In 1956, Hewitt began seeking architects to design him a modern-style yet rugged building, as Deere & Co's staff had little experience designing buildings. Hewitt consulted several friends including Ford Motor Company executive Robert McNamara and the industrial designer Henry Dreyfuss. Dreyfuss gave Hewitt a packet with the qualifications of two dozen architects and suggested that he talk to the architect Eero Saarinen if he wanted "an architect's architect". Hewitt promptly decided that he wanted to hire Saarinen, and he went to Saarinen's Kresge Auditorium and General Motors Technical Center for design inspiration, meeting with Saarinen at the Technical Center.

Before Saarinen was formally hired, he and Hewitt began looking at sites around Moline in August 1956, borrowing a cherry picker from a local utility firm so Saarinen could peer above the trees. One of these sites, an assemblage on the Mississippi River that Deere & Co. already owned, was rejected because of its proximity to a junkyard and railroad tracks. The men also looked at other landowners' properties but rejected many of them for esthetic reasons. Hewitt eventually acquired a set of four farms, (Note: While contemporary sources cite an area of 675 acres (273 ha), Hewitt later recalled that the assemblage had spanned 720 acres (290 ha).) which had belonged to the Arp, Cundy, Hamerlinck, and Schwenneker families. The site Hewitt selected, on Coaltown Road, was close to several highways, including the planned Interstate 280. It took about a year to obtain the lots, which cost $600 per acre ($1,500/ha) on average. Saarinen was enthusiastic about the site, which he called "the best possible site", in part because it contained hills and fields around which he could design his buildings. Despite the site's remoteness, he wanted the design to emphasize the scenery.

==== Design ====
Although Saarinen's design would cost more than one created by an in-house architect, Deere & Co.'s board of directors granted Hewitt permission to hire Saarinen, who obtained the design contract on January 31, 1957. Afterward, Hewitt outlined his requirements for the site, which included a display building, auditorium, cafeteria, dining room, and offices for up to 1,000 people. The Deere & Co. Headquarters was one of five major industrial complexes that Saarinen designed in the 1950s, along with the General Motors Technical Center, IBM Rochester, the IBM Watson Research Center, and the Bell Labs Holmdel Complex. Saarinen wanted to create a design that was functional, pleasing to its employees, and representative of Deere & Co.'s products.

Saarinen's earliest drawings called for an inverted pyramid made of reinforced concrete, but Hewitt considered this design to be architecturally lacking. Within three weeks, Saarinen had prepared an alternate plan for steel buildings in a ravine. John Dinkeloo, an architect with Saarinen's practice, suggested using self-rusting weathering steel to give the buildings an industrial look, having rejected several other materials. Because the use of Cor-Ten steel for architectural purposes was still novel, Dinkeloo and Saarinen tested a piece of Cor-Ten steel to see how it would withstand different weather conditions. Some of Deere & Co.'s engineers were concerned about the use of weathering steel, as it seemingly contradicted the warnings that the company's own engineers had given to farmers about the dangers of rust. Edmund Cook, the company's chief legal counsel, worked with Saarinen's team in deciding the arrangement of the offices. Because many of the existing trees were dying of Dutch elm disease, the landscape firm Sasaki Associates was hired to reconfigure the landscape, including new plantings.

The company announced plans in August 1957 for the 675-acre (273 ha) John Deere Administration Center in Moline, which was to include several buildings designed by Saarinen. Deere & Co.'s board of directors approved Saarinen's plans for the site in June 1958; at the time, work was supposed to begin in early 1959. The plans called for three buildings in a ravine north of Coaltown Road, with weathering steel facades and glass footbridges. The local newspaper The Dispatch wrote that Saarinen had been so impressed with an existing oak tree that he used it to set the theme for the entire complex's architecture. For example, Saarinen selected a dark-brown color for the building's steel frame, allowing the beams to blend in with the nearby forest (and vice versa). The site of the main building, between two hills, was specifically selected because it sat on a ridge running north–south, with a high density of tree cover.

==== Construction and opening ====
Deere & Co. began soliciting bids for the general construction contract in July 1961, and Huber, Hunt & Nichols was hired to construct the first two buildings. Saarinen died on September 1, shortly after the final drawings had been completed and a few days after the construction contract had been awarded. Roche and Dinkeloo were retained to oversee the project's completion. The Deere & Co. headquarters was one of several commissions that Roche-Dinkeloo had received from Saarinen's former clients following his death.

In October 1961, Limbach Company received a $2.8 million contract to install the mechanical systems in the first two structures, at which point workers were busy clearing the land. The Smelser Concrete Corporation of Indiana began pouring concrete for the first buildings in early 1962, and the steel frame had reached the fourth floor of the main building by that May. To celebrate the company's 125th anniversary, the Moline Association of Commerce gifted Deere & Co. officials an oak tree in December 1963, which was planted near the headquarters' entrance. The project also included adding 30 acres (12 ha) of lawn and 800 trees, along with removing 2,500 diseased trees.

By late 1963, Deere & Co. was preparing to relocate its 850 employees from the downtown Moline office early the following year, at which point the project was budgeted at $8 million. The company anticipated that it would take just one weekend to relocate all of the employees; it took six months to plan the relocation, since company officials had to determine which items to relocate. Deere & Co. began relocating its employees on April 17, 1964, and the Administration Center opened for its first workday on April 20. At the time of the opening, some of the landscaping was still underway. Deere & Co. officials added a plaque commemorating Saarinen beside a giant oak tree that adjoined the entrance. The complex was formally dedicated on June 5, 1964, and initially employed 900 workers. After the Administration Center opened, the old headquarters building was destroyed, being replaced with manufacturing facilities.

=== 1960s to 1980s ===
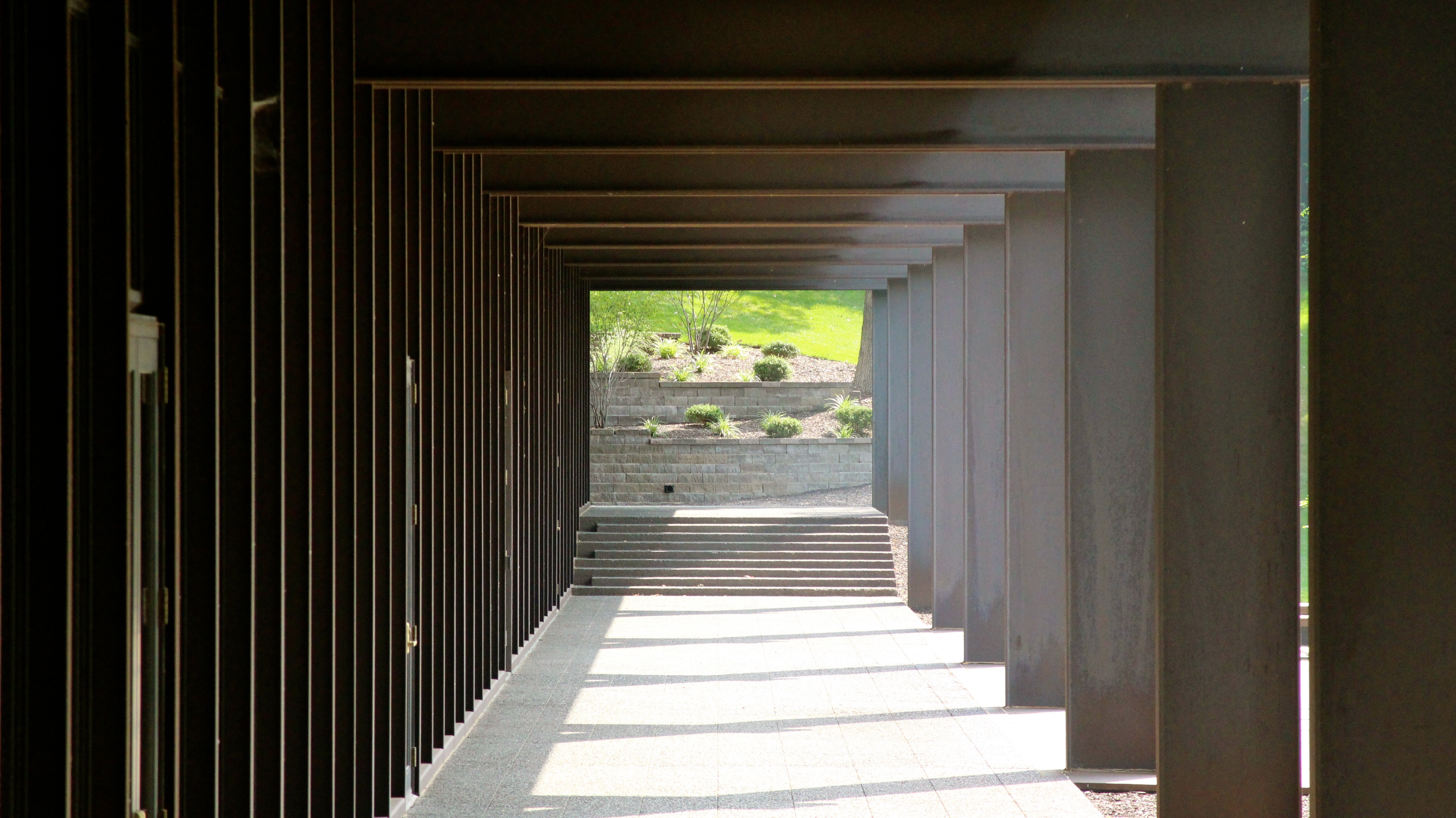
Walkway of the main building

The main building was constructed with provisions for connections to additional buildings in the south and west. As the first workers were moving in, Hewitt asked Saarinen's firm, Eero Saarinen & Associates, to draw up plans for these buildings. The new complex received large amounts of attention from around the world, and by the late 1960s, the Administration Center hosted thousands of annual visitors. The company showcased its products in the display building. In its early years, the complex also hosted events such as a luncheon for former US President Dwight D. Eisenhower, a reception for French diplomat Charles Lucet, and a Japanese art festival. The complex had recorded over 300,000 visitors by 1970. The Japanese engine manufacturer Yanmar donated 300 carp to the headquarters in 1972, which were placed in one of the complex's lakes. That year, the Rock Island County government proposed seizing about 8.3 acres (3.4 ha) on the western perimeter of the headquarters to extend 13th Street south from 42nd Avenue to John Deere Road; the plan was postponed due to Deere & Co.'s opposition. The county later recommended that only part of the road be constructed, to 34th Avenue, which Deere & Co. supported, and the revised road plans were approved in 1973. A cast of Henry Moore's sculpture Hill Arches was installed in one of the lakes in 1974.

Deere & Co. announced in 1975 that it had hired Roche-Dinkeloo, a successor firm to Saarinen Associates, to design Deere West, a two-and-a-half story office annex west of the main building. The annex, connected to the main building via a footbridge, was to include an indoor atrium garden and a parking lot, the latter of which was to be built on the newly completed extension of 13th Street. It took more than a year for 20 Roche-Dinkeloo staff to design Deere West, which Roche believed should be "straight forward and dignified". A groundbreaking ceremony for Deere West was hosted on May 11, 1976. Workers erected a plywood barrier to protect plants around the planned annex's site; work on Deere West was delayed during 1977 due to labor strikes. Deere West opened on June 25, 1978, with a private tour for several Deere & Co. executives. The third floor of Deere West was initially unoccupied and was reserved for future office expansion.

After completing Deere West, Deere & Co. contemplated yet another office building for its insurance and export departments, the Financial Services Building, with a separate entrance from the rest of the complex. Plans for the four-story Financial Services Building, also designed by Roche-Dinkeloo, were announced in April 1979. In contrast to the earlier buildings' Cor-Ten steel facades, the new structure was to have an aluminum-siding facade because Deere & Co. "didn't want to keep doing the same thing in architecture". Deere & Co. began soliciting construction bids for that building in July 1979, and it was completed in 1981. That June, Deere & Co. announced that it was considering a new five-story building for educational programs. This building, which was supposed to be constructed east of the existing structures, would have had a glass dome surrounded by dormitories and other spaces. However, the company struggled for the rest of the decade due to a downturn in the agricultural industry. Deere & Co. continued to regularly host events such as lectures, film screenings, and recitals at the complex. A crew of nine people maintained the grounds, including Deere West's atrium.

=== 1990s to present ===
Deere & Co. continued to maintain its display area into the 1990s; at that point, the headquarters was open for tours seven days a week, with guided tours on weekdays. The company also built a health center nearby for its employees in 1993, and smoking was banned in the offices the next year as part of a change to company policy. In 1995, Deere & Co. announced that it would construct the John Deere Pavilion in downtown Moline to accommodate visitors who had previously traveled to the headquarters. When the John Deere Pavilion opened two years later, some large objects were relocated there from the main headquarters, but most of the headquarters' collection remained in place.

The company increased the headquarters' security in 1997, banning visitors from proceeding past the footbridges. By the late 1990s, the complex had 1,400 workers and 40,000–50,000 annual visitors. The Illinois Department of Transportation (IDOT) acquired some of John Deere's land in 1996 for a widening of John Deere Road, the only road connecting with the campus's access road. At the time, John Deere Road was two lanes wide, causing congestion at the beginnings and ends of Deere & Co. workers' shifts. As part of this project, the section of John Deere Road leading to the campus was converted into a service road, and the complex received a new address; the widening project was ultimately completed in late 1999. After Sentry Insurance acquired John Deere Insurance in 1999, Sentry leased the Financial Services Building. In 2000, Deere & Co. began constructing a new technical center immediately northeast of the headquarters buildings for $15 million. The construction of that structure, which was completed c. 2001, required designating that site as an enterprise zone.

Deere & Co. continued to occupy the Deere World Headquarters in the 21st century, even as many other corporate clients were selling off their respective campuses. By the late 2000s, the John Deere World Headquarters was one of over two dozen facilities that were operated by Deere & Co. in the Quad Cities area of Iowa and Illinois; these facilities employed nearly 6.500 people combined. The product display building continued to host exhibits of Deere & Co.'s products, which were open to the public. The complex employed 1,300 people in the 2010s, although it was no longer open to the public by then, being open only to staff and company clients.

== Impact ==
=== Reception ===
==== Contemporary ====
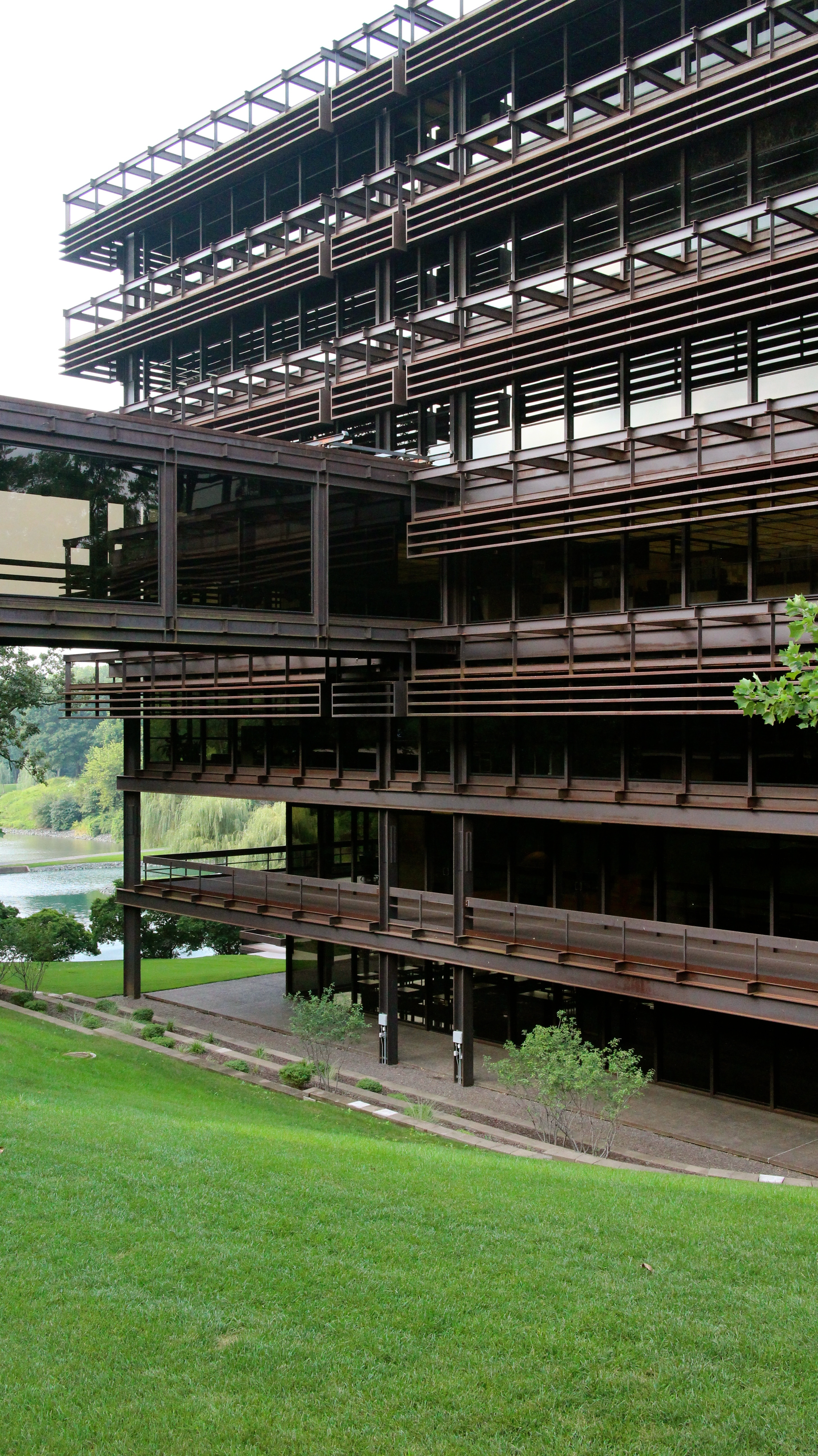
The main building and eastern footbridge, looking south toward the lakes

The John Deere Headquarters received a large amount of attention from architectural critics when it was completed. When the complex opened, The Daily Times of Davenport, Iowa, called it a "tribute to the genius of two craftsmen who lived and worked a century apart", namely Eero Saarinen and company namesake John Deere. Saarinen's widow, the architectural critic Aline B. Saarinen, said the steel louvers and footbridges "make you feel you are in motion". The Des Moines Register called it a "picture of stark strength" because of the self-rusting steel, while The Dispatch suggested that the rusted-steel facade fit better with the natural setting than the similarly-styled Chicago Civic Center did in its urban setting. Walter McQuade wrote for Architectural Forum that the buildings simultaneously resembled modern architecture and ancient Japanese buildings. Architectural Record magazine said that the complex's "bold, direct expression of steel construction" contravened the prevailing architectural trend toward lightweight, glassy buildings, and Time magazine likened it to "some forgotten, gargantuan reaper waiting for the Jolly Green Giant".

John Jacobus wrote for the architectural magazine The Architectural Review in 1965 that the design was more organic and monumental than other Saarinen-designed structures such as the Gateway Arch, airport terminals, and embassies, which Jacobus saw as cliched and less "mature". Vincent Price wrote in 1968 that he felt the buildings were "a thought, an intellectuality, a creative idea made manifest", quoting McQuade's observations about the complex, and said that the design created a "sense of belonging". The historian Vincent Scully regarded the John Deere Headquarters as an exception to what he described as Saarinen's penchant for "the insistent American instinct for simplistic". A decade after the headquarters' completion, the Quad-City Times viewed the buildings as "the most visually striking combination of structure and landscape in the Quad Cities today". In a 1977 interview, Hewitt recalled that his wife told him, "The most important thing you ever did was to build that building with Eero."

After the 1978 expansion was completed, the Quad-City Times called the buildings "modern, yet rugged and down to earth", while Allan Temko, writing for the San Francisco Chronicle, called it a "corporate Versailles". Paul Goldberger of The New York Times wrote that, although the buildings were "orderly, precise and elegant work environments", the annex had softer design details than the original structures. Elizabeth Brenner of the Chicago Tribune wrote that "a showpiece is what [John Deere] got with Saarinen's first building" and that the western office building simply extended the original building's design principles. Several critics likened the west building's atrium to that of Roche-Dinkeloo's earlier Ford Foundation Building in New York, and Temko considered the Deere & Co. atrium superior to the Ford Foundation's. Architectural Record wrote that the complex was a place where "one can honestly feel that architectural homage has been paid to both nature's nature and man's nature". By contrast, The Architectural Review found the headquarters' self-sustaining, rustic feeling to be "false and unnatural".

==== Retrospective ====
The historian Wayne G. Broehl wrote in a 1984 book that, with the construction of the John Deere Headquarters, the company became one of a "few American manufacturing corporations to make a positive cultural and aesthetic impact on its home community". Broehl considered the headquarters' development to be the high point of Hewitt's tenure as Deere & Co.'s chief executive. A writer for The Wall Street Journal in 2001 compared the buildings to rusting farm equipment. In 2005, Building Design magazine wrote that the complex was "a masterpiece of high modern corporate design". The next year, the writers Eeva-Liisa Pelkonen and Donald Albrecht wrote that the complex constituted "a renovated corporate image for a farm equipment company on the cusp of the industrial age".

Justin Davidson of New York magazine wrote in 2009 that the headquarters' design "invites the slanting light of late afternoon; it is at once brawny and picturesque", saying its weathering-steel facade was more successful than Saarinen's concrete designs for Yale University's Morse College and Ezra Stiles College. William Morgan wrote for Architect magazine in 2019 that the design had resisted the influence of Ludwig Mies van der Rohe that was present in Saarinen's other works, and that the buildings instead evoked the designs of Eero's father Eliel and Alvar Aalto. Morgan described the buildings as having a "monumentality not seen since Beaux-Arts classicism from the turn of the 20th century." In 2026, Architectural Record magazine included the John Deere Headquarters on its list of "the most significant works of American architecture". The architect William Horgan said the use of weathering steel and the building's integration with its landscape contributed to a feeling of "understated sophistication and quiet confidence".

=== Awards, media, and architectural influence ===
According to the biographer Jayne Merkel, the first buildings were "considered [Saarinen's] most unqualified success". After the first buildings were completed, they received a Collaborative Medal of Honor from the Architectural League of New York in 1965. The same year, the building received the American Institute of Architects' (AIA) First Honor Award for excellence; in granting that award, a jury of five panelists called the buildings "a frank and clear and yet delicate structure". In a 1976 poll of American-architecture experts, several experts ranked the John Deere Headquarters among the United States' best buildings. Administrative Management magazine also gave its Office of the Year award to both the original buildings and the Deere West annex following these structures' respective completions.

The landscape design received an American Society of Landscape Architects Classic Award in 1991 for its "archetypal corporate setting". The buildings also received the AIA's Twenty-five Year Award in 1993, in honor of the longevity of their design; it was the sixth time one of Saarinen's buildings had won that award. (Note: This includes the Crow Island School and Christ Church Lutheran, which Saarinen designed with his father. The other three projects to win the award were the General Motors Technical Center, the Dulles International Airport Main Terminal, and the Gateway Arch.) AIA Illinois, the AIA's statewide chapter, designated the headquarters as one of its 150 "Great Places" in 2007, while the historic-preservation organization Landmarks Illinois gave the buildings a preservation award in 2009. In celebration of the 2018 Illinois Bicentennial, AIA Illinois selected the John Deere World Headquarters as one of 200 "Great Places" in Illinois. It was also recognized by USA Today Travel magazine as one of AIA Illinois' selections for Illinois 25 Must See Places.

The John Deere World Headquarters was detailed in a 1975 book by Mildred and Edward Hall, which investigated how the John Deere buildings and other commercial structures influenced the people who used them. For its 40th anniversary, the complex was also featured in an exhibit focusing on the winners of the Twenty-five Year Award. The design of the John Deere World Headquarters also influenced similar office campuses during the late 20th century, and Roche's work on the Deere complex prompted the developer Charles Davidson III to hire him to design a building in Metro Atlanta. A writer for Architectural Record cites the complex as having influenced David Chipperfield's design of the Figge Art Museum in Davenport, Iowa. After the completion of the Deere complex, Roche went on to use Cor-Ten steel in other structures such as the Ford Foundation Building, the Knights of Columbus Building, and the New Haven Coliseum.

== See also ==
- List of works by Eero Saarinen
  - Bell Labs Holmdel Complex
  - The General Motors Technical Center
  - The Rochester Technology Campus
