= John Dinkeloo =

US Navy soldier and architect (1918–1981)

John Dinkeloo FAIA
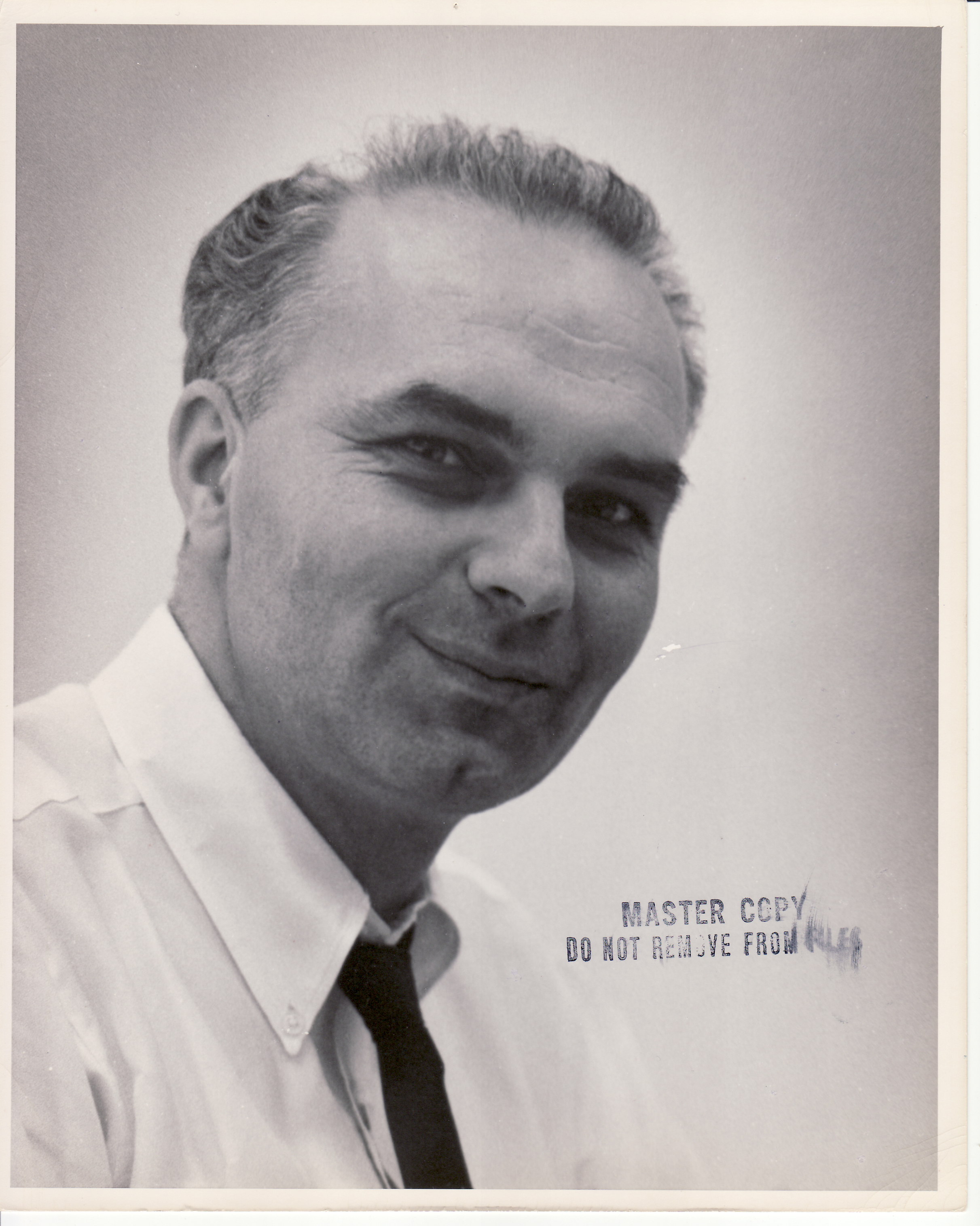
- John Dinkeloo
- Born: John Gerard Dinkeloo; February 28, 1918; Holland, Michigan
- Died: June 15, 1981 (aged 63); Fredericksburg, Virginia
- Education: Hope College Michigan; University of Michigan
- Occupation: Architect
- Awards: AIA Gold Medal; Twenty-five Year Award; American Academy of Arts and Letters Gold Medals; Pritzker Prize
- Practice: Kevin Roche John Dinkeloo and Associates
- Buildings: Head Office for Bouygues; Lafayette Tower; Shiodome City Center; U.S. Securities and Exchange Commission; Museum of Jewish Heritage; Santander Central Hispano; 1101 New York Avenue; Ford Foundation; John Deere World Headquarters; Metropolitan Museum of Art; Oakland Museum of California
- Website: Kevin Roche John Dinkeloo and Associates

John Gerard Dinkeloo (February 28, 1918 – June 15, 1981) was an American architect who was active during the 20th century. He was a principal in the architectural firm Roche-Dinkeloo.

== Biography ==
=== Early years ===
Dinkeloo was born in Holland, Michigan, to William Dinkeloo and Bessie (nee) Brouwer in 1918.

=== University and early career ===
Dinkeloo went to Hope College in his hometown, then finished his education at the University of Michigan in 1942, received a Bachelor in Architectural Engineering.

=== World War II ===
After graduating, Dinkeloo joined the United States Navy and entered WWII, where he commissioned as a lieutenant and served in the Naval Construction Battalion otherwise known as the Seabees.

=== Post-World War II ===
Dinkeloo joined Skidmore, Owings & Merrill in Chicago, first as a designer and later as Chief of Production.

=== Eero Saarinen & Associates, Michigan ===
In 1950, Dinkeloo left Skidmore, Owens, & Merrill and returned to his home state where he joined Eero Saarinen and Associates in Bloomfield Hills, Michigan. Saarinen quickly saw the potential in Dinkeloo, and was named partner in 1956. While with the Saarinen firm, Dinkeloo was involved with the TWA Terminal at Kennedy (Idlewild) Airport, the Dulles Airport Main Terminal, the St. Louis Gateway Arch, and both Morse College and Ezra Stiles College at Yale University.

== Roche Dinkeloo ==
After Eero Saarinen's untimely death in 1961, Dinkeloo and fellow partners, Kevin Roche and Joseph N. Lacy, continued the Saarinen firm after they moved to Hamden, Connecticut. There, the firm moved into a home bought by Eero Saarinen, and the firm was renamed Roche Dinkeloo & Associates that same year. John Dinkeloo was head of Saarinen's Technical Department who was keenly aware of the latest innovations using avante-garde building materials from glass to the new composites. Dinkeloo, as his partner Roche, remained unpretentious throughout his career.

His interest into exploring new materials or products was, as he stated, "brought about by the lack of research in construction materials." Two materials that he particularly hastened in developing were weathering steel and reflective glass which changed the face of architecture. Weathering steel received its first architectural application in the Deere & Co. Administrative Center in 1964, the Ford Foundation Building, the Knights of Columbus Tower, and the adjoining Veterans Memorial Coliseum. Reflective glass was first used in the Bell Telephone Laboratories Development Center of 1962. The glass proved to be so successful in its reflective quality that eventually the entire building was sheathed in mirror glass.

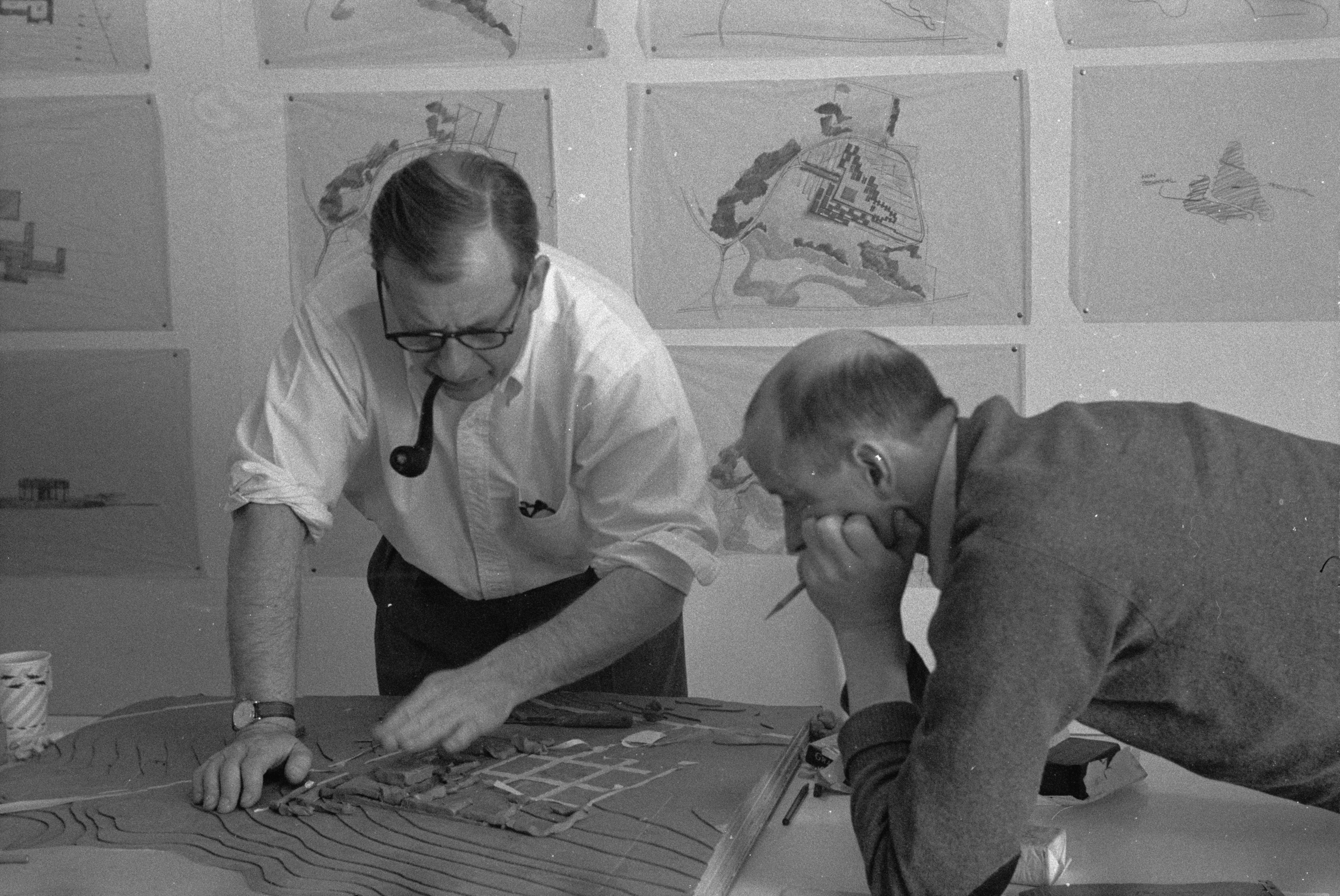
Roche (right) with Eero Saarinen in the 1950s

In 1951, he joined the firm of Eero Saarinen and Associates. His future partner, Kevin Roche (1922-2019), joined the firm in 1951. Dinkeloo became the Principal Technical developer and head of Production to Saarinen and assisted him on all projects from that time until Saarinen's death in September 1961.

In 1966, Roche and Dinkeloo formed Kevin Roche John Dinkeloo and Associates and completed Saarinen's projects. They completed 12 major unfinished Saarinen builds, including some of Saarinen's best-known work: the Gateway Arch, the expressionistic TWA Flight Center at JFK International Airport in New York City, Dulles International Airport Main Terminal outside Washington, DC, the strictly modern John Deere Headquarters in Moline, Illinois, and the CBS Headquarters building in New York City.

Following this, Roche and Dinkeloo's first major commission was the Oakland Museum of California, a complex for the art, natural history, and cultural history of California with a design featuring interrelated terraces and roof gardens. The city was planning a monumental building to house natural history, technology, and art, and Roche provided a unique concept: a building that is a series of low-level concrete structures covering a four block area, on three levels, the terrace of each level forming the roof of the one below, i.e. a museum (in three sections) with a park on its roof. This kind of innovative solution went on to become Roche's trademark.

This project was followed by the equally highly acclaimed Ford Foundation Building in New York City, considered the first large-scale architectural building in the U.S. to devote a substantial portion of its space to horticultural pursuits. Its famous atrium was designed with the notion of having urban green-space accessible to all and is an early example of the application of environmental psychology in architecture. The building was recognized in 1968 by Architectural Record as "a new kind of urban space".

The acclaim that greeted the Oakland Museum and Ford Foundation earned Kevin Roche John Dinkeloo and Associates a ranking at the top of their profession. Shortly afterward they began a 47-year association with the Metropolitan Museum of Art in New York City, for which they did extensive remodeling and built many extensions to house new galleries including the one containing the Egyptian Temple of Dendur. Other high-profile commissions for the firm came from clients as varied as Wesleyan University, the United Nations, Cummins Engine, Union Carbide, The United States Post Office, and the Knights of Columbus.

Kevin Roche John Dinkeloo and Associates has designed numerous corporate headquarters, office buildings, banks, museums, art centers, and even part of the Bronx Zoo. The architectural team of Roche Dinkeloo quickly became the poster child of corporate America building campuses.

Many notable awards were bestowed on his partner Kevin Roche, such as the Pritzker in 1982, the Gold Medal Award from the American Academy of Arts and Letters in 1990, and the AIA Gold Medal, but an unassuming, modest, and quiet man, Dinkeloo chose to steer far from the limelight. Dinkeloo died on June 15, 1981, in Fredericksburg, Virginia, aged 63.

=== Notable works ===
When Saarinen's office was designing the Deere & Company Administrative Center in 1964, Dinkeloo pushed the use of exposed steel. He found one kind that had been used for coal-hopper cars in the 1930s, which corroded to yield a dense oxide protective coating. He had a difficult time convincing manufacturers that it could work and would not be too thick to weld. Nonetheless, he pursued this idea and the firm continued to use these materials.

==== Advances in glass ====
As early as general manager at Eero Saarinen's firm, Dinkeloo showed intense interest in the application of glass at that time. Dinkeloo saw that glass would reduce the heat load. When the firm began designing the Bell Lab Development Center in Holmdel, N.J., in 1962, Dinkeloo, inspired by Bell Lab's work with metallized polyester film on air balloons, developed a process of putting the solution on glass and then laminating the two panes in a vacuum so that it would not stripe.

By the time the firm was designing the John Deere Headquarters Building in Moline, Illinois, Dinkeloo was adding a bronze metal spray to the process. By the mid-1960s, when Kevin Roche and John Dinkeloo had officially changed the name of the firm, another period was beginning technically as well as architecturally. "The buildings/products industry was catching up with architectural visions... No longer was there was funding to conduct painstaking research as in the past. Nevertheless, Dinkeloo did continue to refine and investigate new ideas." Some did not take off. "One of the most visually arresting was a glass used for the Irwin Union Bank & Trust addition in Columbus, Indiana." Dinkeloo sprayed metallized film on clear glass in broad stripes alternating with bands of green laminated glass to give the space a pattern and transparency of light filtered through venetian blinds. One of his most significant innovations was the use of metalized, mirror-like glass in exterior walls, which deflects heat and substantially reduces air-conditioning requirements.

Dinkeloo began the investigation of mirrored glass to see how it was made (metal particles were deposited on it in a vacuum chamber). Also at that time (late 1950s), the space industry, and especially Bell Laboratories was using an extra thin metallized polyester film for air balloons. Dinkeloo then found someone laminating the film between two pieces of glass. But he wasn't satisfied completely. Since the metallized film wasn't applied in a vacuum, the glass tended to stripe. By combining the two processes of coating glass with the metallized solution and then laminating the two panes of glass, a reflective glass pane with the properties of safety glass was created.

Dinkeloo's technical developments and refining as well as pioneering new applications of materials for architectural use was applied to many of KRJDA's projects. Dinkeloo was keen in finding ways in which "form and techniques would continue to be inseparable-where architecture, in the best modernist tradition, would draw equally from both a formal image and a technical idea."

Dinkeloo's last project was to develop a more rigid aluminum siding of flat strips for the General Foods in Rye, New York and an insurance building for the John Deere headquarters.

== Prizes and awards ==
The works of John Dinkeloo are mutually inclusive along with those of Kevin Roche, and have been the subject of special exhibitions at the Museum of Modern Art, the Architectural Association of Ireland in Dublin, and the American Academy and Institute of Arts and Letters. A 2012 exhibition, Kevin Roche: Architecture as Environment, opened at the Yale School of Architecture in New Haven, Connecticut, and has been viewed at The Museum of the City of New York, and the Building Museum in Washington, DC.

== Buildings ==
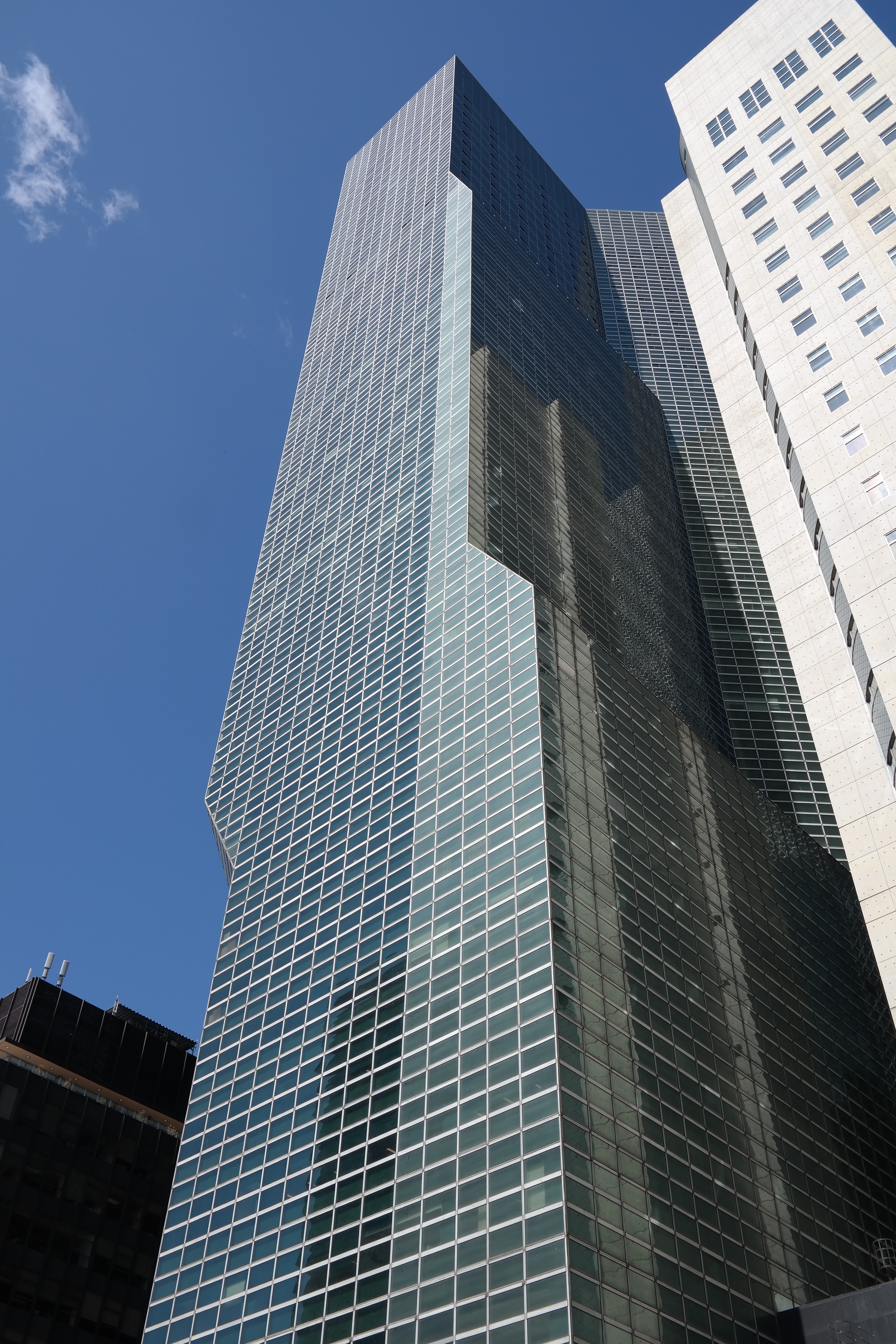
One UN Plaza depicting Roche-Dinkeloo's signature modernist design, showing chamfers or slant backs on northern and southern faces (1975).

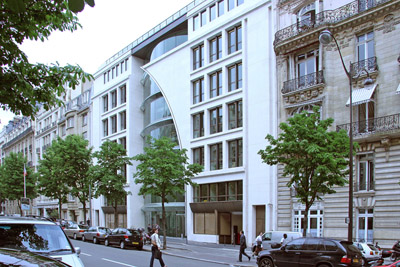
The Head Office for Bouygues SA Holding company received the “Haute Qualité Environnementale (HQE)” which is the highest certification for environmental quality in building design in France.

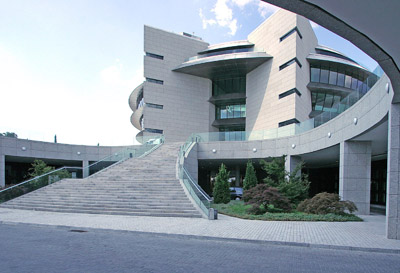
Headquarters for Santander Central Hispano located in Madrid, Spain.

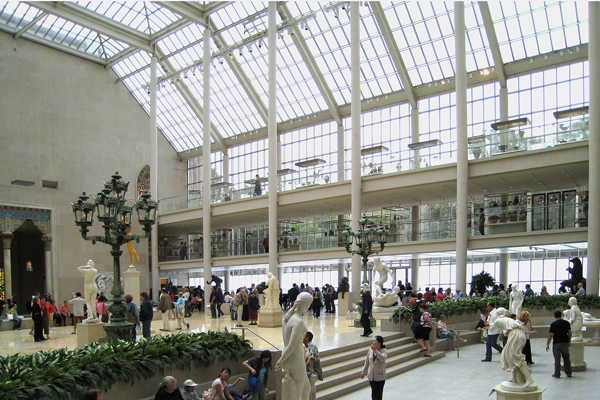
New American Wing for Twentieth Century Art at the Metropolitan Museum of Art.

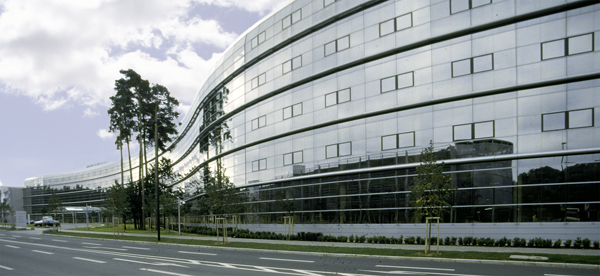
The continuous glass wall at Lucent Technologies in Nuremberg, Germany, wraps around the complex to create a unified street facade.

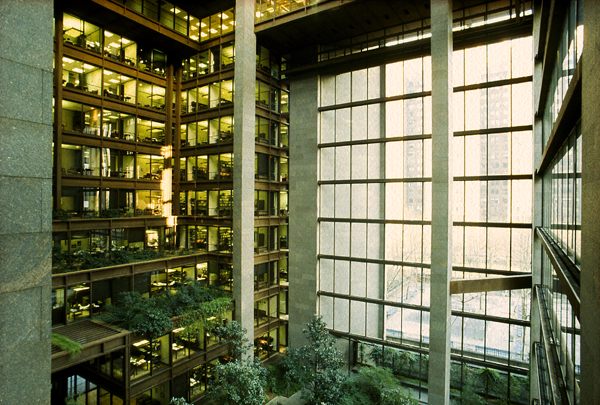
Ford Foundation Headquarters

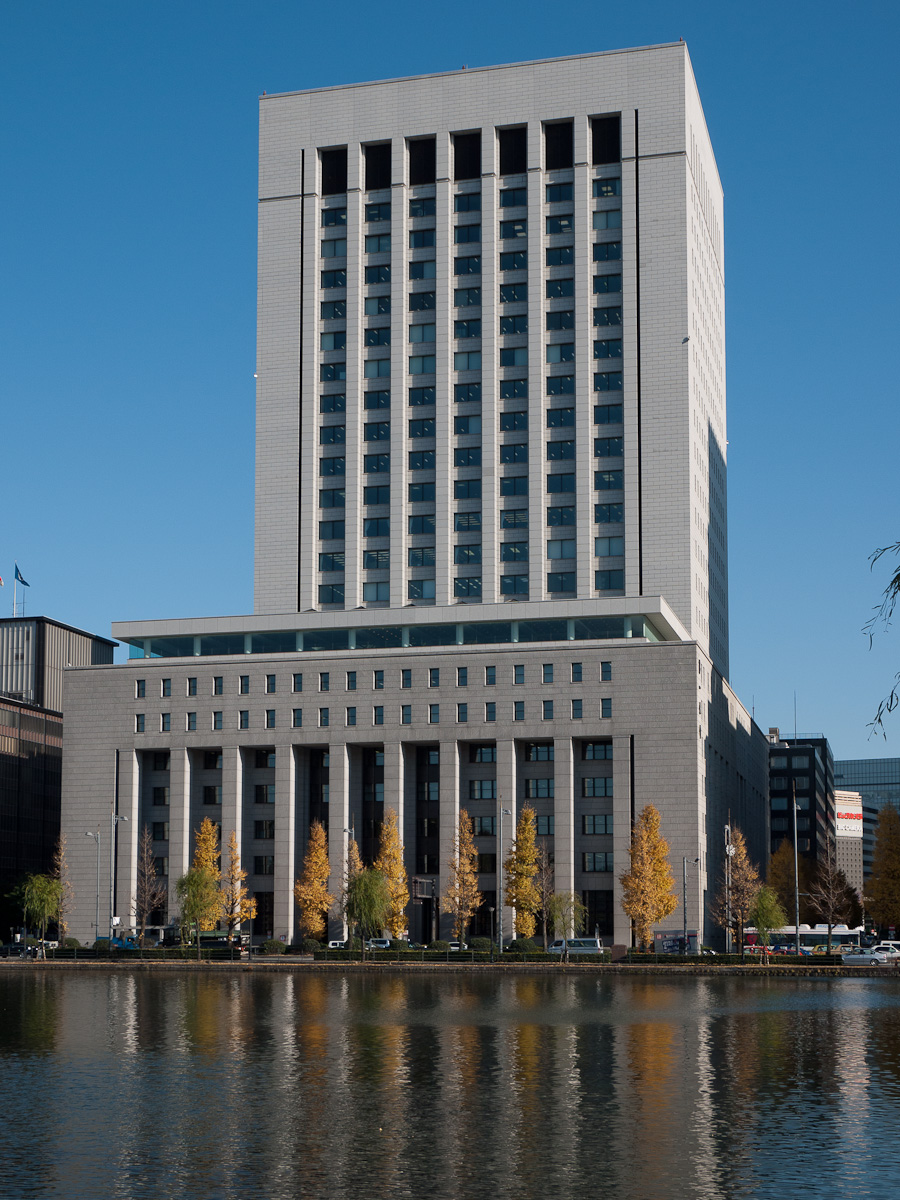
The DN Tower 21 in Tokyo, Japan.

- 1966 – Oakland Museum of California, Oakland, California
- 1968 – The Ford Foundation Building, New York, New York
- 1969 – Administration, Student Union & Physical Education Buildings, Rochester Institute of Technology, Rochester, New York
- 1969 – The Knights of Columbus Building Headquarters, New Haven, Connecticut
- 1969 – United States Post Office, Columbus, Indiana
- 1969 – Aetna Life and Casualty Company Computer Headquarters, Hartford, Connecticut
- 1971 – Power Center for the Performing Arts, University of Michigan, Ann Arbor, Michigan
- 1972 – Cummins Inc. Irwin Office Building Arcade, Columbus, Indiana
- 1972 - New Haven Coliseum, New Haven, Connecticut, (demolished 2002)
- 1973 – Center for the Arts, Wesleyan University, Middletown, Connecticut
- 1973 – Cummins Midrange Engine Plant, Columbus, Indiana
- 1974 – Fine Arts Center, University of Massachusetts Amherst, Amherst, Massachusetts
- 1974 – Worcester County National Bank, Worcester, Massachusetts
- 1972 – The Pyramids, College Life Insurance Company of America headquarters, Indianapolis, Indiana
- 1975 – One United Nations Plaza, New York, New York
- 1978 – John Deere World Headquarters, West Office Building, Moline, Illinois
- 1979 – Denver Performing Arts Complex, Denver, Colorado
- 1982 – The Corporate Center, Danbury, Connecticut (originally the Union Carbide Corporate Center)

== Awards and honors ==
Dinkeloo was the recipient of numerous honors and awards, including:

- American Institute of Architects – AIA Gold Medal — 1985
