= Grant Wood's "Fall Plowing" Rural Historic Landscape District =

Historic district in Iowa

- U.S. National Register of Historic Places
- U.S. Historic district
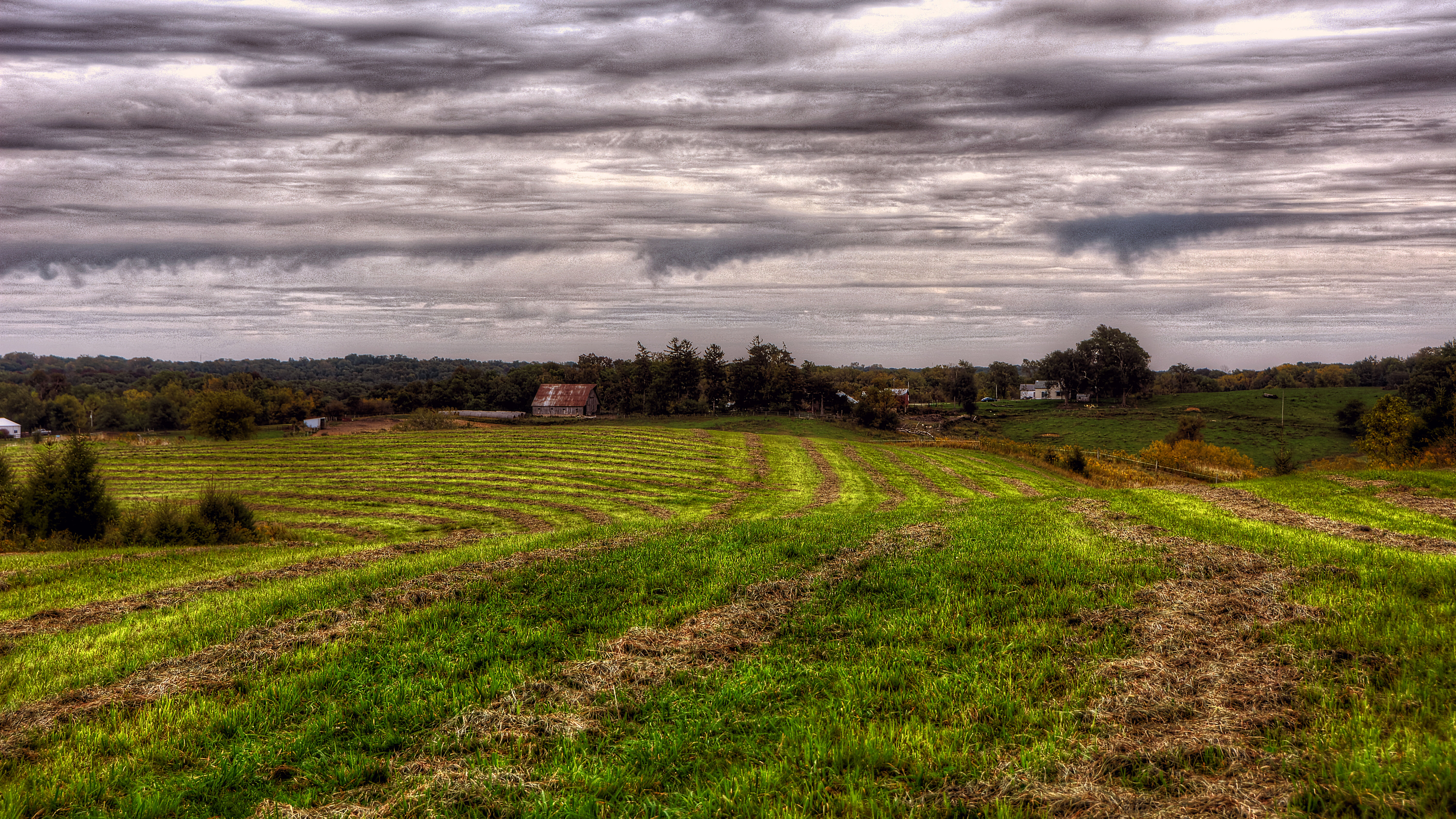

- Location within Iowa Location within the United States
- Location: 0.5 mi. N of jct. of Matsell Ln. and Stone City Rd.
- Nearest city: Viola, Iowa
- Coordinates: 42°6′55″N 91°23′20″W
- Area: 123 acres (50 ha)
- Built: 1931
- Architectural style: Gabled front and wing house
- NRHP reference No.: 03000476
- Added to NRHP: May 30, 2003

Grant Wood's "Fall Plowing" Rural Historic Landscape District is a 123-acre (50 ha) historic district near Viola, Iowa.

A date of significance for the district is 1931. It was listed on the National Register of Historic Places in 2003. The district includes four contributing buildings and one other contributing site.

== History ==
This historic district is the location where Grant Wood sketched for his 1931 painting Fall Plowing. The painting is one of Wood's regional works that features the agrarian life of rural Iowa. The district includes four buildings that Wood depicted in the painting, including two barns that he omitted from the final painting. Grant Wood's 1931 oil on canvas painting Fall Plowing is part of the John Deere Art Collection.
