= Fall Plowing =

1931 painting by Grant Wood

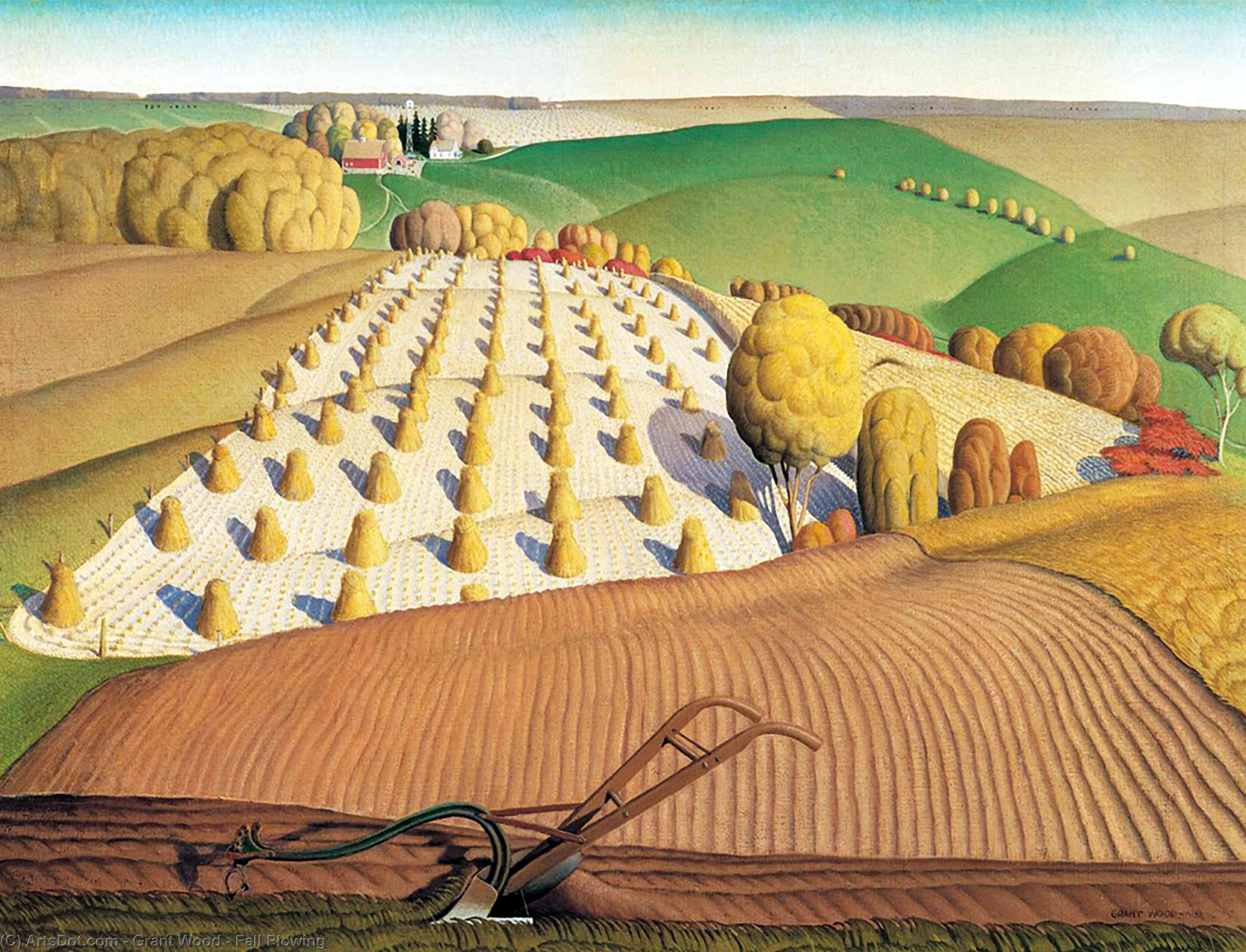
- Artist: Grant Wood
- Year: 1931
- Medium: Oil on canvas
- Dimensions: 76 cm × 100 cm (30 in × 40 in)
- Owner: John Deere Corporation Moline, Illinois, USA

Fall Plowing is a 1931 oil painting by Grant Wood depicting a plowed field in his home state of Iowa. It pays homage to the recently developed walking plough and steel plowshare commonly used by farmers in the Midwestern United States during this time. It emphasizes the important role that new technologies played on the development of prairie land into workable farmland. The area is now listed on the National Register of Historic Places.

The original painting is part of the John Deere collection.
