= Hill Arches 1973 =

Sculpture series by Henry Moore

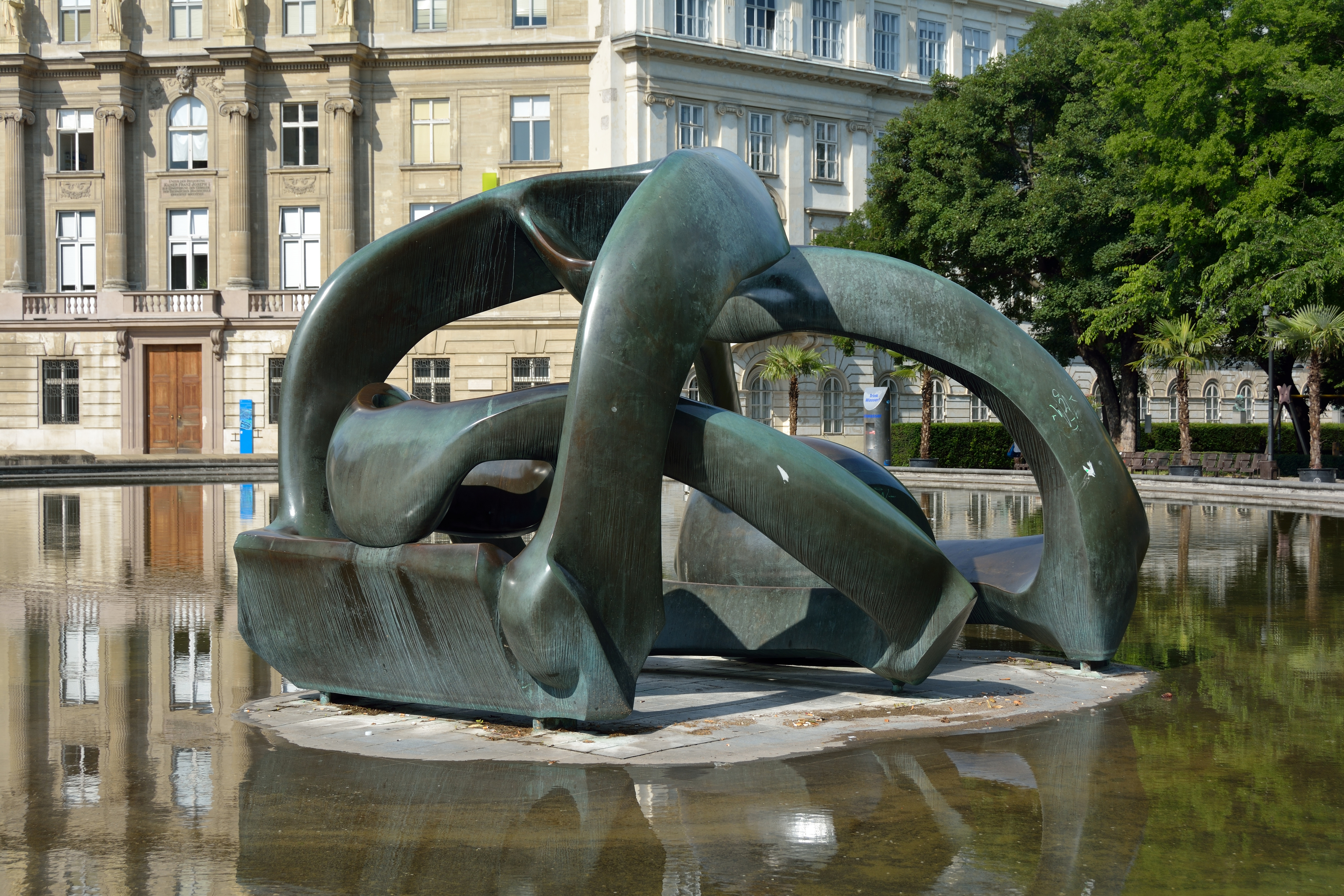
- Hill Arches in June 2014
- Artist: Henry Moore
- Year: 1973
- Catalogue: LH 636
- Medium: Bronze
- Dimensions: 550 cm (220 in)

Hill Arches is a bronze sculpture by Henry Moore, catalogued as LH 636.

== Description ==
The piece is made of four separate parts, three of which are described by Roger Berthoud, Moore's biographer, as being stirrup-shaped; the fourth is a large sphere.

== Casts ==
One cast is situated in the Karlsplatz in front of the Karlskirche in Vienna, where it was installed in 1978 – initially to complaints that it disrupted the views of the historic church. Another is sited at the headquarters of Deere and Company in Illinois.

== See also ==
- List of sculptures by Henry Moore
