= William Alexander Hewitt =

American diplomat (1914–1998)

- Born: August 9, 1914; San Francisco, California, U.S.
- Died: May 16, 1998 (aged 83); Rutherford, California, U.S.
- Occupation: Businessman
- Known for: Chief executive officer and president of John Deere (1955–1982); United States Ambassador to Jamaica (1982–1985)
- Political party: Republican

William Alexander Hewitt (August 9, 1914 – May 16, 1998) was the former chairman of Deere & Company of Moline, Illinois, and the last of the Deere Family to run the company. He served as United States Ambassador to Jamaica from 1982–1985.

== Early life ==
William Alexander Hewitt was born in San Francisco, California, on August 9, 1914, to a prosperous family that had arrived from England in 1883. William had two siblings: a brother, Edward T. Hewitt, Jr.; and a sister, Adrienne Delphine Hewitt. William's father, Edward T. Hewitt of San Francisco, operated the Hewitt-Ludlow Auto Company, which manufactured trucks, tractor-trailers, and fire engines until 1930. William's mother Jeannette Brun Hewitt was born to the Brun family of Napa Valley, California. His maternal grandmother and grandfather Brun were descendants of French winemakers who arrived in 1882.

Hewitt attended Lowell High, graduating in 1931 at the age of 16. After graduating, he worked for two years as a messenger for the American Trust Company to save money for college tuition. Hewitt's father died the same year William started at University of California, Berkeley.

In 1937 Hewitt graduated from the UC Berkeley as a member of Alpha Delta Phi fraternity, with a Bachelor of Arts in economics and a minor in political science. After graduating he attend Harvard Business School for a year, but he lacked the funds to complete a graduate degree and returned to California. He took a job with the accounting department of Standard Oil of California in San Francisco (1938–1939), and then with Texaco in 1939. In 1940 he worked as a copywriter for Roos Brothers, a men's clothing chain in San Francisco.

== Military service ==
Immediately after the Japanese attack on Pearl Harbor, Hewitt joined the Navy, commissioned as an ensign. At first, he served primarily as a gunnery officer on the USS St. Louis in the Solomon Islands in the Pacific. Then, promoted to lieutenant commander, he served from 1942 to 1946 aboard the battleship USS California as a combat information center radar officer. He participated in the invasions of Saipan, Tinian, and Guam, and the battle of Surigao Strait.

== Family life ==
After the war, Hewitt took a job as territory manager for a Ford-Ferguson farm equipment distributor. While representing Ford, he was invited by one of his Alpha Delta Phi fraternity brothers to a wedding in Santa Barbara with other members of their fraternity. During his stay, he met Patricia Deere Wiman. Tish, as she was known, was the daughter of Pattie Harris Southall Wiman and Colonel Charles Deere Wiman, President of John Deere. She was the great-great-granddaughter of John Deere, the founder Deere & Company.

Hewitt and Patricia married in 1948. In 1955, the couple moved to Moline, Illinois, where Hewitt became chief executive officer of Deere & Company after working for them in San Francisco. They had three children. Twin girls, Adrienne Deere and Anna Deere Hewitt, were born on July 17, 1955, and christened at Christ Episcopal Church in Moline, IL. Alexander Southall Hewitt was born on July 15, 1957, christened at Christ Episcopal Church in Moline, February 1958.

While the children attended St. Katherine's School, Patricia worked at her Rock Ridge home and at Friendship Farms, their 375-acre equestrian horse farm for breeding and training Arabian horses and growing grains and feed. Patricia was an award-winning equestrian, long distance horse rider, horse jumping trainer, published photographer, and philanthropist. Her charity work focused on the Red Cross during and after World War II and later on environmental, social causes, and civil rights. "Active in charitable organizations, she sought to fight AIDS, to help disabled children and to ease the plight of American Indians." She held meetings for civil rights leaders in her home and organized volunteers and provided disaster relief for families and farmers across the country.

== Modern-day father of Deere & Company, 1948–1982 ==
Hewitt was the fifth chief executive officer and last representative of the Deere family to run the company. During his tenure at Deere & Company, Hewitt turned the small domestic company into the world's leading farm equipment manufacturer with sales of over $5 billion.

In 1948 Hewitt took a job the San Francisco branch of Deere & Company and was elected to the board of directors in 1950. He was named as executive vice president in 1954 and upon the death of Charles Deere Wiman in May 1955, succeeded him as chief executive officer and president. At the time Deere & Company was a domestic manufacturer with $339 million in yearly sales.

Hewitt worked to build a robust brand and worked closely with the firm's public relations department to increase consumer awareness of their products. In 1960 Deere & Company soon introduced a new line of four tractors, the 1010, 2010, 3010, and 4010 with the smallest, the 1010, rated at under 36 Power Take-off horsepower, with the largest, the 4010 at 84 horsepower. All four models had power steering and the two largest had hydraulic power brakes. New transmissions were designed for all four, and all sizes had a choice of gasoline, diesel, or LP engines. The agricultural press and farmers were enthusiastic about the products. These models were introduced in Dallas, Texas on what came to be known as "Deere Day in Dallas". The following day in the jewelry department of Neiman Marcus, the Hewitts joined Stanley Marcus and industrial designer Henry Dreyfuss to unveil a 20-foot package to promote the new line of tractors.

During Hewitt's early administration the company made an aggressive move into international markets, which ushered in a time of growth. While on vacation in France in the late 1940s he had been shocked to see some farmers still using a horse or oxen and a plow. Competitors were expanding abroad, but Deere & Company had a less than dozen manufacturing entities in the United States and one in Canada. He convinced the board and got approval for international expansion in 1955. The first international venture, in 1956, was the German tractor company Heinrich Lanz AG. He went to Mannheim, Germany, to negotiate the purchase. The workers went on strike as the result of a new rule that limited the amount of beer they were allowed to consume during their breaks. Acquisitions or plant constructions followed in France, Spain, Argentina, Mexico, and South Africa. Hewitt struggled with unforeseen problems with foreign exchange, Communism, and apartheid-related problems.

In South Africa, while many companies were divesting from Africa and pulling out, he believed that a foreign presence could apply pressure to implement change and that he could work to eliminate inequities. He started cautiously in the 1960s, but by the 1970s he had pushed hard to make the Deere plant in Nigel, Gauteng a model for moving black workers into management. Apartheid leaders pressured black workers not to show up to work. Hewitt helped the black township of Duduza, where the workers lived, to upgrade the schools by working with the government and providing grants to build a new school. When Nelson Mandela became president, the Deere South African plant became significantly profitable. Hewitt continued to expand in Canada, Western Europe, and Latin America.

Hewitt described Russia as a reluctant customer. In the 1920s and early 1930s, Deere sold huge quantities of agricultural machinery to Russia, but sales then dried up. When Khrushchev visited the U.S. in 1959, he made a surprise visit to Deere & Company, which prompted a small sale to the U.S.S.R. and encouraged Hewitt to make efforts to increase sales to that country. In 1972 a Deere delegation visited the Soviet Union. After many trips, Hewitt learned that the Soviets were more interested in cotton harvesting equipment than plowing and planting. With this knowledge, Hewitt developed a lighter and faster tractor for cotton harvesting. The Soviet government was ready to agree to the purchase, but following the Soviet invasion of Afghanistan the Carter administration declared an embargo on shipments of American products to the Soviet Union and the deal fell through.

== New headquarters ==
Hewitt hired architects Eero Saarinen and Kevin Roche to design a new Deere & Company headquarters in Moline, Illinois, first occupied in 1964. The building utilized Cor-Ten, a corrosion-resistant unpainted steel, for the exterior structure. This was a departure in architectural design, allowing for natural weathering and for the building itself to emerge as part of the natural landscape. Offices featured natural lighting, a plant-filled atrium, and an indoor barn with outdoor views to incorporate the natural landscape and community. The building has won over 50 design awards, including:

Twenty-Five Year Award, 1993—American Institute of Architects; First Honor Award, 1965—American Institute of Architects; Architectural Award of Excellence, 1965—American Institute of Steel Construction; Silver Medal of Honor, 1965—The Architectural League of New York; Collaborative Medal of Honor, 1965—The Architectural League of New York; "Office of the Year," 1964—Silver Plaque Award Administrative Management Magazine; and National "Plant America" Award, 1964—American Association of Nurseryman.

== Corporate culture ==
Hewitt established the Deere corporate art collection, starting with commissioning a mural painted on the factory display showroom walls. Reflections of an Era by Alexander Girard is a three-dimensional mural depicting rural Americana from 1837 to 1918.

The art collection, which includes 2,300 pieces by artists from all over the world, is on display throughout the company's global facilities. Much of the collection was acquired by Hewitt. For its exemplary support of the arts, John Deere was recognized as a 2005 Business Committee for the Arts (BCA) 10: Best Businesses Partnering with the Arts in America honoree and was inducted into the BCA 10 Hall of Fame.

During Hewitt's tenure as chairman, he initiated and published the Deere Green Bulletins, to improve the then-decentralized offices and improve communications. Topics included corporate goals and the principles behind its basic policies and procedures.

In 1973, Hewitt began testing and working to reduce engine emissions. He formed an energy management program that tracked energy use and required operations to implement energy-conservation initiatives. Under Hewitt's leadership Deere received the Sierra Club Iowa Chapter Industrial Development Research Council Award for Distinguished Service in Environmental Planning. Deere shared the Roll Over Protection System (ROPS) patent with other equipment manufacturers to improve safety for all farmers.

The Moline headquarters drew visits from notable heads of state and celebrities worldwide. Hewitt entertained Presidents Eisenhower and Carter, King Gustav of Sweden, and civil rights leader Martin Luther King, Jr. In 1959 Nikita Khrushchev, the leader of the Soviet Union, paid an impromptu visit to Deere & Company, bringing out the press in droves.

== Philanthropy ==
During the Great Depression, Deere & Company used its financial leverage to aid many of its customers and employees even as its own sales plummeted. In 1931, the company prevented failure of the People's Savings of Moline, re-establishing it as Moline National Bank in 1933. In 1958 Hewitt donated the capital stock it held in Moline National Bank to the John Deere Foundation for charity. He worked closely with Elwood Curtis (chief financial officer at Deere & Company) to establish programs that would fund education and the arts, the Red Cross, and continue to benefit employees, the City of Moline, and to fund agricultural and farming communities in times of need.

The John Deere Foundation, the philanthropic organization funded by the company, has provided hundreds of millions in grants worldwide since it was founded in 1948. After the death of William and Patricia Hewitt, their children Alexander, Anna, Adrienne, and board members continue the philanthropic work through the Rock River Trust Company.

== Government appointments ==
Hewitt received presidential appointments to serve as a member of the Special Committee on United States Trade Relations with European Countries and the Soviet Union (1965), the National Advisory Commission on Food and Fiber (1965–1967), incorporator of the National Corporation for Housing Partnerships (1968), Presidential Task Force on International Development (1969), National Council on the Humanities (1975–1980), and President's Commission for a National Agenda for the Eighties (1980–1981).

He was an honorary member of the American Institute of Architects (A.I.A.), recognized for his extraordinary vision and leadership in promoting excellence in architecture.

== Diplomatic life: U.S. ambassador to Jamaica ==
Hewitt retired from Deere & Company in 1982. On February 26, 1982, Hewitt accepted the position of U.S. Ambassador to Jamaica. On September 29, 1982, was confirmed by the Senate by unanimous consent.

He hosted President Ronald Reagan for first ever overnight visit to Jamaica by a sitting US President.

Diplomatic posts
Preceded by Loren E. Lawrence	United States Ambassador to Jamaica; 1982–1985	Succeeded by Michael Sotirhos
