= Ford Foundation Center for Social Justice =

Office building in Manhattan, New York

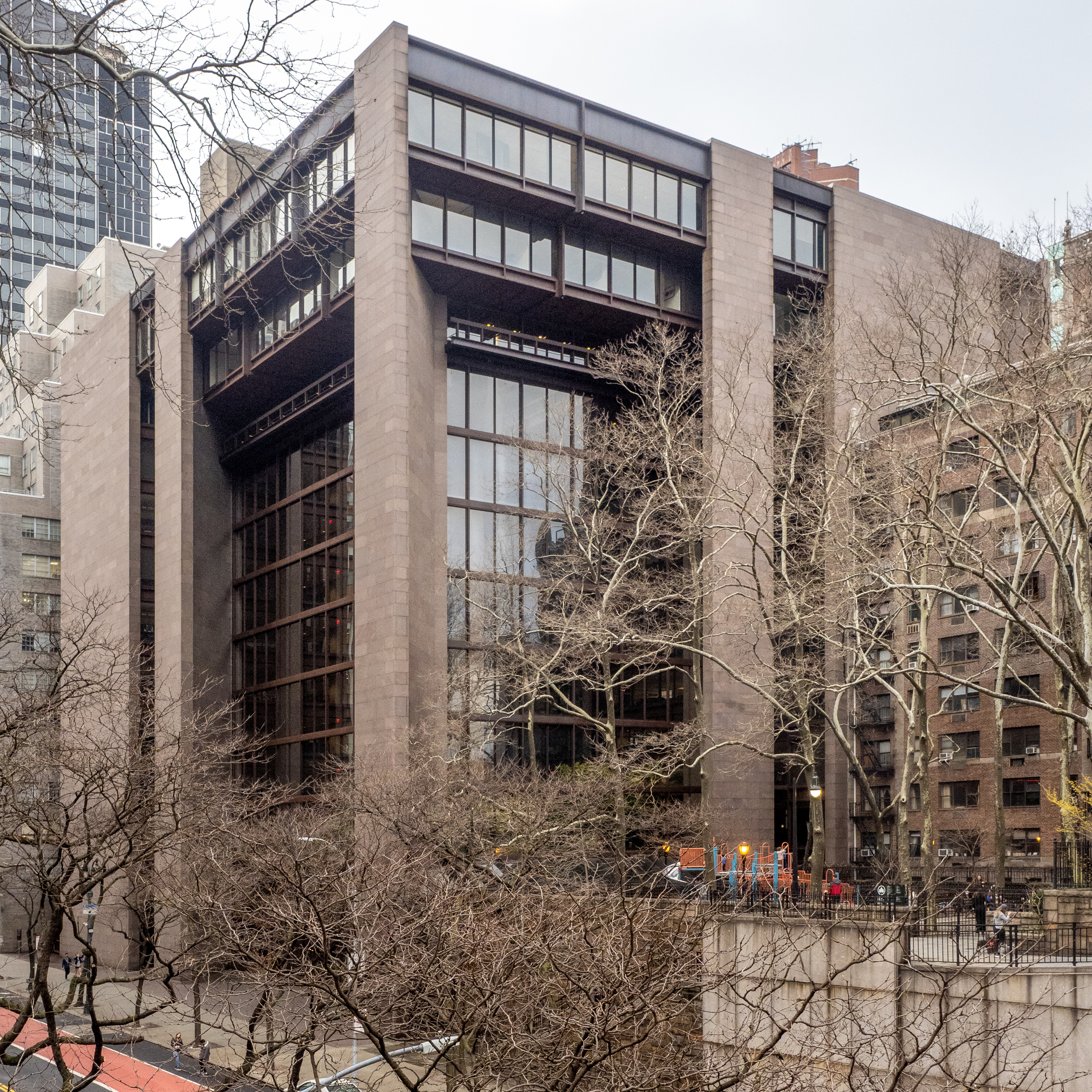
- 42nd Street facade
- Alternative names: Ford Foundation Building

General information
- Architectural style: Late Modernism
- Location: 320 East 43rd Street, Manhattan, New York, United States
- Coordinates: 40°44′59″N 73°58′16″W
- Construction started: 1964
- Completed: 1967
- Inaugurated: December 8, 1967
- Renovated: 2016–2018
- Cost: $16 million
- Client: Ford Foundation
- Owner: Ford Foundation

Height
- Height: 174 feet (53 m)

Technical details
- Structural system: Concrete and steel frame
- Floor count: 12

Design and construction
- Architects: Kevin Roche (building architect), Dan Kiley (landscape architect)
- Architecture firm: Roche-Dinkeloo
- Structural engineer: John Dinkeloo
- Services engineer: Cosentini Associates (mechanical)
- Main contractor: Turner Construction
- Awards: Albert S. Bard Civic Award; Twenty-five Year Award

New York City Landmark
- Designated: October 21, 1997
- Reference no.: 1969 (exterior), 1970 (interior)

The Ford Foundation Center for Social Justice (also known as 320 East 43rd Street, 321 East 42nd Street, or the Ford Foundation Building) is a 12-story office building in East Midtown Manhattan, New York City, United States. Completed in 1967, it was designed in the late modernist style by architect Kevin Roche and engineering partner John Dinkeloo of Roche-Dinkeloo. The building was commissioned as the headquarters of the Ford Foundation, the largest private foundation in the United States when the edifice was constructed.

The building is a glass-and-steel cube held up by piers made of concrete, clad with Dakota granite. The main entrance is along 43rd Street, and there is a secondary entrance on 42nd Street. Dan Kiley was the landscape architect for the large public atrium inside, the first such space in an office building in Manhattan; it includes trees, shrubs, vines, and other plants. Most of the building's offices are north and west of the atrium and are visible from other offices.

Commissioned after Henry Heald became the Ford Foundation's president, the structure was developed on the former site of the Hospital for the Ruptured and Crippled. Final plans for the Ford Foundation Building were announced in September 1964, and the building was formally dedicated on December 8, 1967. The building underwent a major renovation and restoration between 2015 and 2018, and it was renamed the "Ford Foundation Center for Social Justice". The structure received critical acclaim for its design following both completion and renovation, and the New York City Landmarks Preservation Commission has designated the building and its atrium as city landmarks.

== Site ==
The Ford Foundation Center for Social Justice is on the south side of 43rd Street in East Midtown Manhattan, New York City, United States. The building is in the middle of the block between First Avenue to the east and Second Avenue to the west. The main entrance is to the north, with an address of 320 East 43rd Street, and it also has an address to the south, at 321 East 42nd Street. The site measures 202 by 200 feet (62 by 61 m), of which the building occupies 180 by 174 feet (55 by 53 m). The Hospital for Ruptured and Crippled Children (now the Hospital for Special Surgery) had once occupied the plot.

The building, less than one block west of the headquarters of the United Nations, is surrounded by the Tudor City development. The Church of the Covenant is immediately across 42nd Street to the south, and the Daily News Building is diagonally across 42nd Street and Second Avenue to the southwest. The Beaux-Arts Institute of Design and Beaux-Arts Apartments are one block north.

43rd Street is a one-way street sloping down from Tudor City to the rest of the Manhattan grid. Because of the street grid of the area, vehicles traveling to the building must travel east on 41st Street from Second Avenue, turn onto Tudor City Plaza (which crosses 42nd Street), and then turn again onto 43rd Street. This creates a scenic approach for the main entrance while allowing a partial view of the building's atrium from both Tudor City Place and 43rd Street. The approach was intended to be reminiscent of a rural setting, and one architectural critic described it as "not an accident but conscious contrivance". Due to the topography, the 43rd Street entrance leads to the second floor, and the rear entrance on 42nd Street leads to the first floor. On both 42nd and 43rd Streets, the spaces between the lot lines and the facades are paved with red-brown brick.

== Architecture ==
The Ford Foundation Center for Social Justice is 12 stories high and reaches 174 feet (53 m). It was designed by Eero Saarinen Associates (renamed Roche-Dinkeloo in 1966), composed of Kevin Roche and John Dinkeloo, who took over the firm after its namesake, their former boss Eero Saarinen, died in 1961. Roche was involved primarily in design, while Dinkeloo oversaw the construction. Turner Construction was the contractor for the building. Cosentini Associates were the mechanical engineers, Severud Associates were the structural engineers, Michael J. Kodaras was the acoustic consultant, and Warren Platner was the interior-design adviser; Eugene Festa and Philip Kinsella were also hired to advise on the design. In a 1988 book, the historians Richard Berenholtz and Donald Reynolds wrote that the building was, stylistically, "a thematic descendant of the eighteenth- and nineteenth-century Anglo-Chinois garden and of the Victorian conservatory".

The building is set back about 10 feet (3.0 m) behind the lot line. Its 12-story height was chosen because that was the same height as the second-lowest setback on the adjacent office tower on 42nd Street. The design was intended to highlight the Ford Foundation Building as the eastern terminus of the succession of commercial structures along 42nd Street's northern sidewalk. The building could have been built up to 2 1/2 times its ultimate size, thus providing more office space that could be rented. Zoning regulations allowed the building to rise as much as 160 feet (49 m) before a setback was required. The building's developer, the Ford Foundation, wanted it to be at a relatively low height as "a public gesture". Roche also wanted the building to be a main part of what author Eeva-Liisa Pelkonen called a "larger urban context".

=== Facade ===
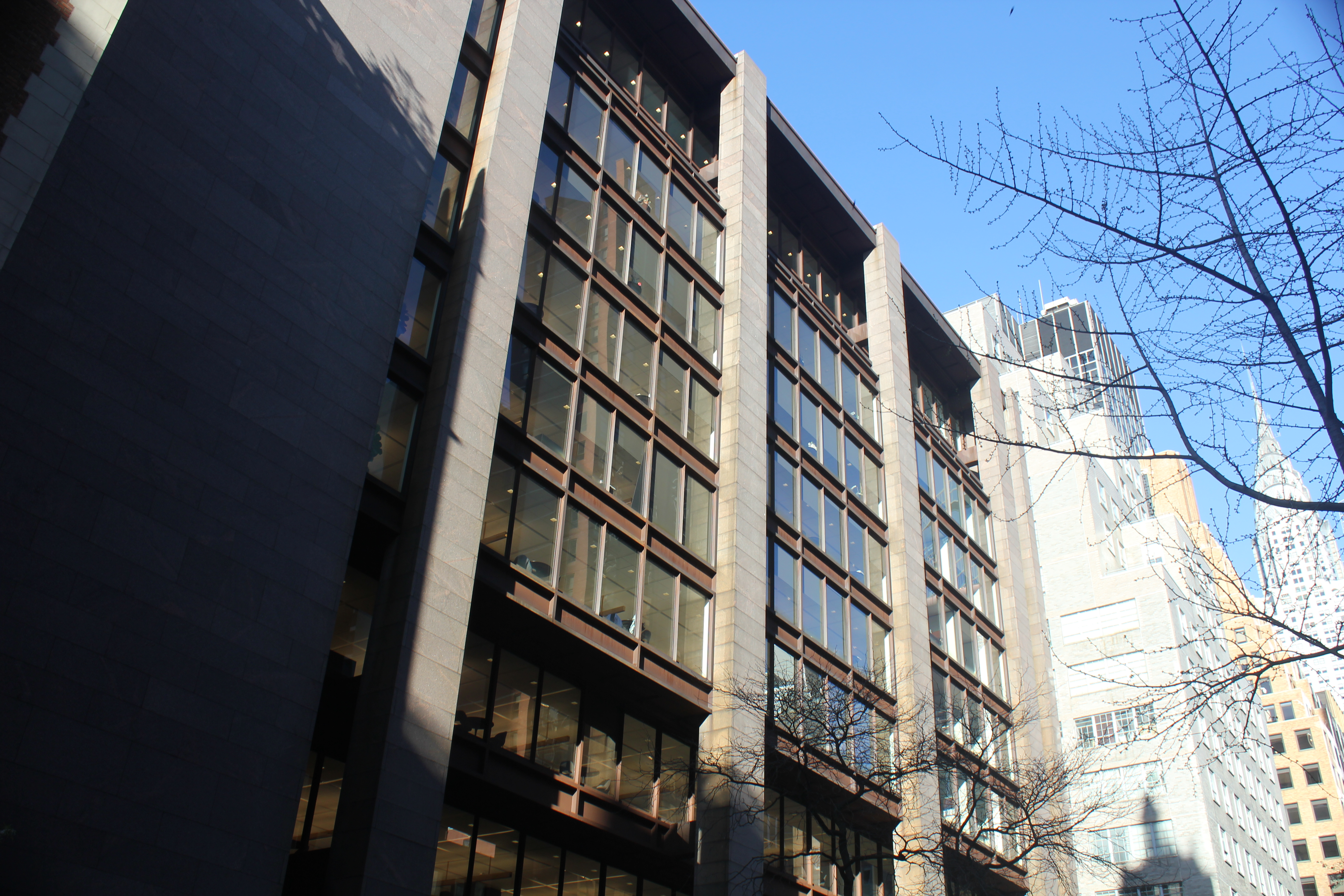
The northern elevation of the facade on 43rd Street

The facade includes concrete piers and walls, which are used primarily in support structures. The concrete is covered with gray-pink or mahogany South Dakota granite, supplied by the John Swenson Granite Company of New Hampshire. There are three granite piers, oriented northwest–southeast at a 45-degree angle to the street, which were intended to give visitors the impression that they were "partially in the building" even before entering. The facade also uses Cor-Ten steel, particularly in sections of the building that overhang other spaces. The steel was allowed to weather to a deep tan color. Although the designers had originally intended to use reinforced concrete, the high cost of that material prompted them to use Cor-Ten steel; at the time, the city's fire-safety codes did not allow the use of exposed structural steel. Interspersed between the steel beams are 60,000 glass panes, which cover 64,051 square feet (5,950.5 m^{2}). These materials were said to "harmonize" with Tudor City's red-brick facades; although Roche criticized Tudor City as "a phony piece of stage-set architecture", he still perceived the setting as "a fairly nice character".

The southern elevation is on 42nd Street. The western part of this elevation is a windowless granite slab. The eastern portion consists of two large granite piers: one at the center of the facade and one at the southeastern corner. On the eastern section of the facade, the first through tenth stories have a recessed glass wall; the eleventh and twelfth stories are recessed at a lesser depth and are carried over this recess by a glass-walled enclosure with an I-beam on top. The twelfth story protrudes further out than the eleventh story, and a catwalk hangs underneath the eleventh story. An entrance with a revolving door is between the two diagonal piers, and there is another set of doors in the space between the center pier and the western section of the facade. As of 2024, the 42nd Street entrance was closed to the public.

The eastern elevation faces Tudor City. It is similar to the 42nd Street elevation in that the northern section is clad with granite; the southern section is a recessed glass wall. There is a diagonally oriented pier in the center of the eastern elevation. The southeast-corner pier does not face onto the eastern elevation. The eleventh and twelfth floors, as well as the catwalk, are also recessed to a lesser extent than the first through tenth floors.

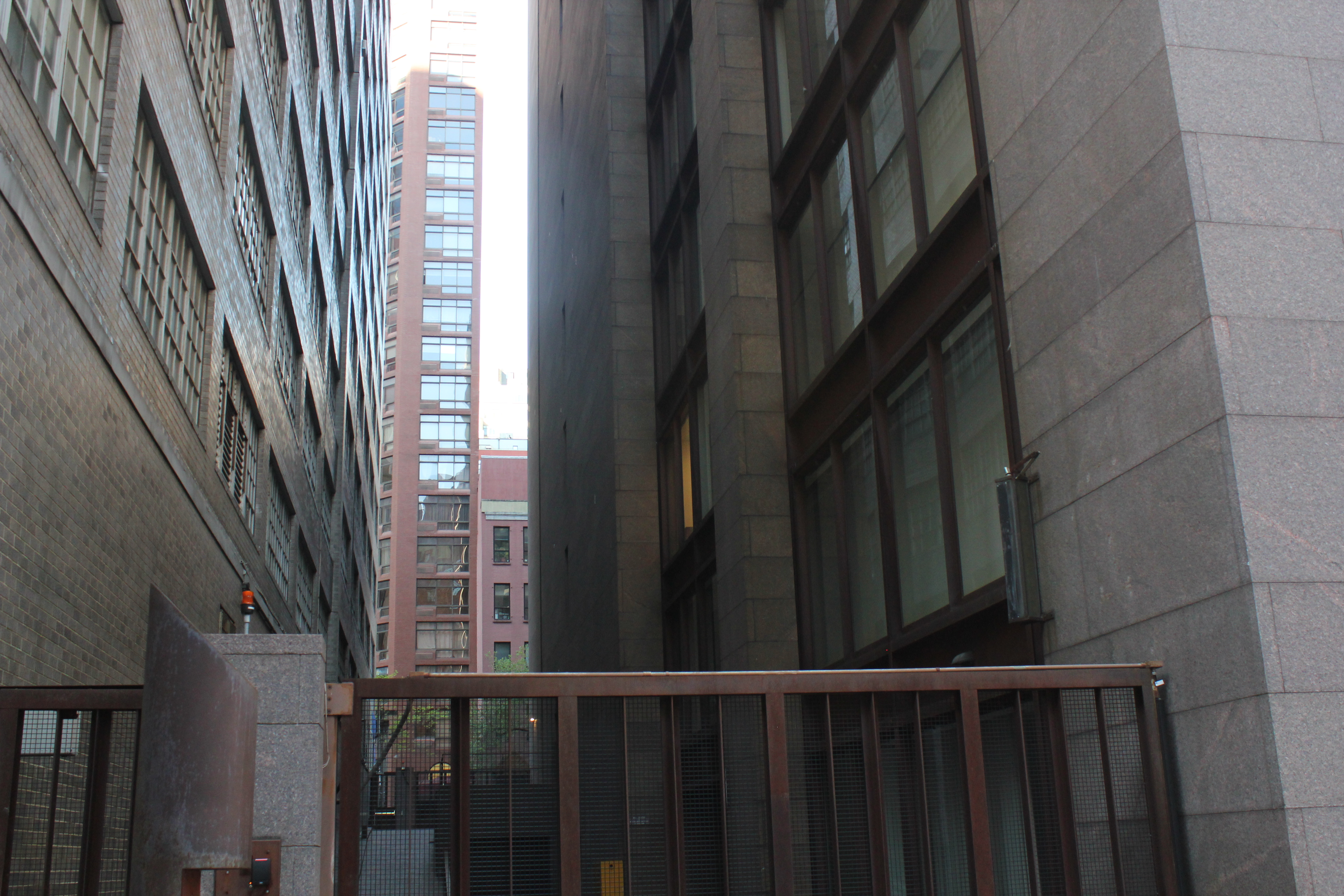
The western elevation of the Ford Foundation Building (at right) faces a private driveway.

The northern elevation is on 43rd Street. The easternmost part of the facade is a windowless granite slab. The rest of the facade is composed of glass-walled offices between four narrow granite piers that divide the windows into three vertical bays. The second-floor entrance is recessed significantly inward, creating a brick-paved porte-cochère behind the four piers. There are two brass double doors at this entrance. The third and fourth stories are recessed as well, but at a progressively smaller scale, and the eleventh and twelfth stories are also slightly recessed. The setbacks on this elevation were designed to reflect the terraced garden inside.

The western elevation faces a private driveway. It is faced with granite, with a narrow bay of windows and two wider window bays from north to south. This private driveway also has brick pavers, a loading dock, and garage and service entrances. When the building was completed, the color of the granite blended in almost completely with the adjacent buildings, as seen from Second Avenue.

=== Interior ===
The Ford Foundation Building is built around a 1/3-acre (0.13 ha) public atrium with a 100-by-100-foot (30 by 30 m) square floor plan and a 160-foot-high (49 m) ceiling. The garden inside the atrium was designed by Dan Kiley, one of Saarinen's frequent collaborators. The atrium occupies much of the building's southern and eastern elevations. Above ground level, most of the upper stories are composed of narrow wings on the northern and western sides of the atrium, arranged similarly to Spanish buildings with interior courtyards. These wings measure 30 feet (9.1 m) wide, facing either the atrium or the street. The eleventh and twelfth floors are suspended from a pair of girders and overhang the lower floors and the atrium. Unlike the lower floors, they have open plan workspaces on all four sides, surrounding square openings at their centers. The interiors cover 415,000 square feet (38,600 m^{2}), of which 290,000 square feet (27,000 m^{2}) can be used as offices.

Warren Platner designed the interior spaces. The parquet floors are made of white oak, interspersed with raised floor tiles made of ceramic. Almost every decorative metal piece in the building was originally made of brass; marble drinking fountains and linen wall coverings were also used. Other decorations were made of natural materials, including wool rugs inset into the oak flooring, as well as furniture made of leather and mahogany. The original custom-designed furniture was costly; the chairs for the Ford Foundation's directors each cost $500, (Note: equivalent to $4,828 in 2025) and the smallest mahogany desks were $700. (Note: equivalent to $6,759 in 2025) The building also included works of art, including lithographs from Old Masters, when it opened.

==== Atrium ====
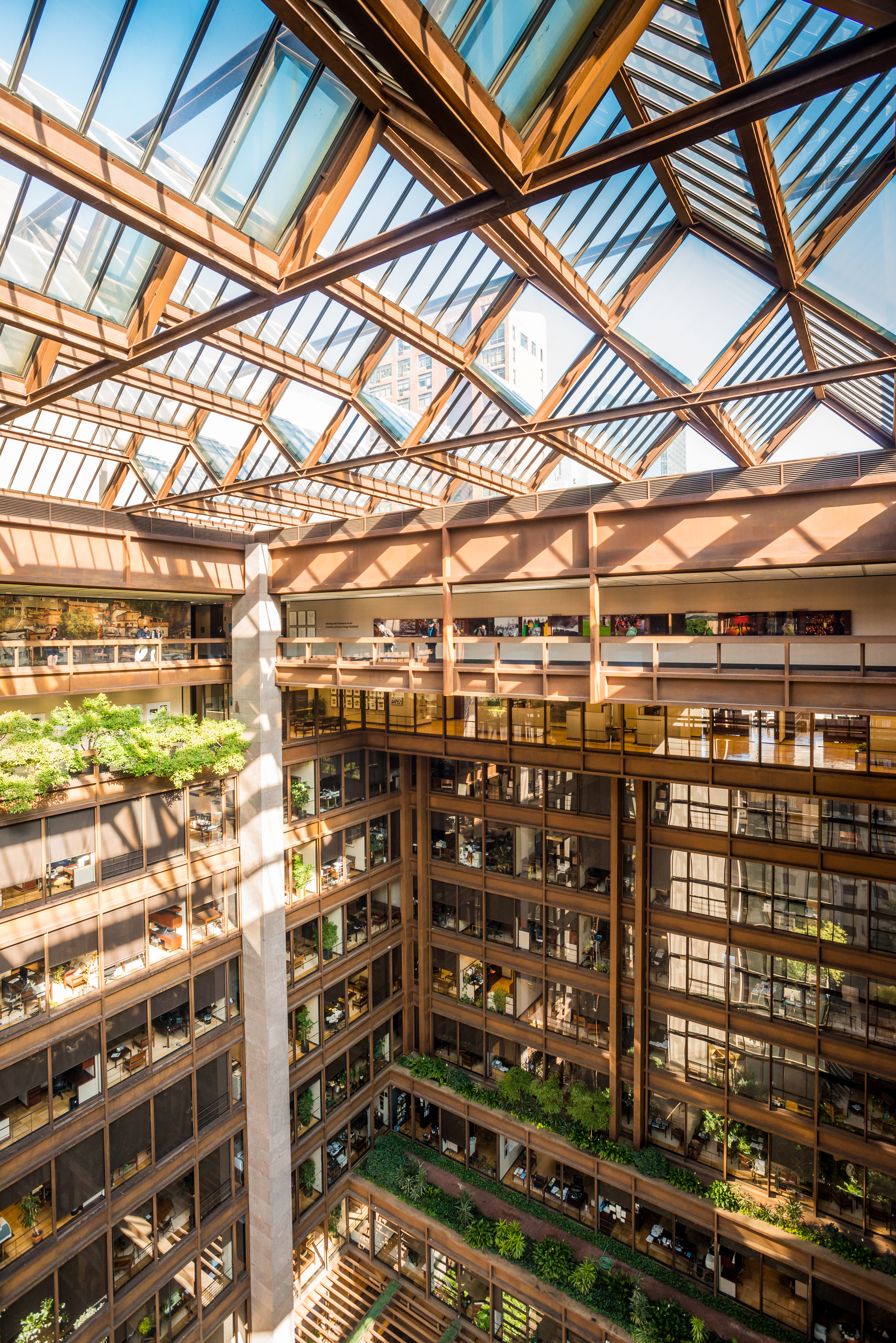
Atrium with garden

The atrium is open to the public during the daytime and is free to visit. The garden contains several tiers sloping up from 42nd to 43rd Street, with an elevation change of 13 feet (4.0 m). The atrium is more easily accessed from 42nd Street; the building's lobby is closer to 43rd Street. At the building's northwest corner, the lobby links with several elevator banks. A stair within the atrium's western section ascends to the lobby. There are also several smaller stairs and ramps. A wheelchair lift at the atrium's southeast corner connects the garden's tiers. The floor pavers are oriented west–east and are made of brick. Iron bars, resembling the facade's Cor-Ten steel beams, are embedded in the pavement.

As originally arranged, the atrium had 18 aquatic plants, 37 trees, 148 vines, 999 shrubs, and 22,000 ground cover plants. (Note: Kaufmann-Buhler 2022, p. 1033, agrees on the number of aquatic plants, vines, and ground-cover plants, but says there were 17 trees and 1,000 shrubs. A Baltimore Sun article from 1984 also stated that the building had 17 trees, 1,000 shrubs, and 20,000 ground-cover plants. An article from 1990 and the book New York 1960 both describe the building as having 17 trees, 18 aquatic plants, 148 vines, 999 shrubs, and 21,954 ground-cover plants.) These were planted within 650 cubic yards (500 m^{3}) of topsoil. Kiley primarily selected woodland plants that could survive the atrium's highly variable humidity, which ranged from 10% in the winter to 50% in the summer. There were also 250 movable pots with flowers in different colors, which were rotated out fortnightly. The plantings were arranged in and around a central square fountain; coins thrown into the fountain were used to help finance the atrium's upkeep. Kiley transported some eucalyptus plants from California in the ultimately unrealized expectation that they would grow to 80 feet (24 m), thereby providing shade for the upper-story offices. The soil they are planted in rests atop a fiberglass membrane and layers of gravel and rocks.

The garden originally had drainage, irrigation, sprinkler, and lighting systems to ensure that the plants grew. A pipe deposits rainwater from the roof into a storage tank in the basement. A sprinkler system is installed under the garden, and a cistern at the building's southeastern corner collects condensation. Water from both the tank and cistern is used to irrigate the plants. Because of the presence of skyscrapers nearby, artificial light illuminates the garden. The atrium was originally lit by 76 spotlights on the eleventh floor and 43 lights at ground level, although these lights were subsequently replaced. Several Dakota granite piers support a glass roof above the atrium, and the paths are made of red-brown brick pavers. A 9,000-square-foot (840 m^{2}) glass roof, composed of greenhouse-like "sawtooth" panels, is above the atrium. Kiley had projected that the garden would have "a Darwinian struggle of the fittest", with only some plants surviving the atrium's difficult climatic conditions. Over the years, many of the original plants have had to be replaced. By the late 2010s, landscape designer Raymond Jungles of Jungles Studio had replanted the atrium with subtropical flora.

At the time of the building's completion, the city government did not have zoning guidance specifically for indoor public areas. Roche had intended for the atrium to spur informal encounters and serve as a meeting area, and the Ford Foundation wanted to avoid the cramped feeling of other office structures like the nearby United Nations Secretariat Building. The public atrium contrasted with contemporary International Style structures, which had plazas outside their respective buildings. The greenery was intended to resemble that of Tudor City's parks to the east. Roche stated in 1963 that an indoor garden had not previously been constructed in a contemporary building but, when interviewed later, said such gardens had become more common. Despite Roche's intentions, the atrium originally had no benches (to prevent homeless people from sleeping there overnight); a single bench was subsequently added near the pool. A guard was hired to ensure that people did not loiter or lean on the steps. The atrium also did not have food concessions, as food was banned. The atrium remained publicly accessible after the September 11 attacks in Lower Manhattan in 2001, when other public spaces citywide were being closed off.

==== Offices ====
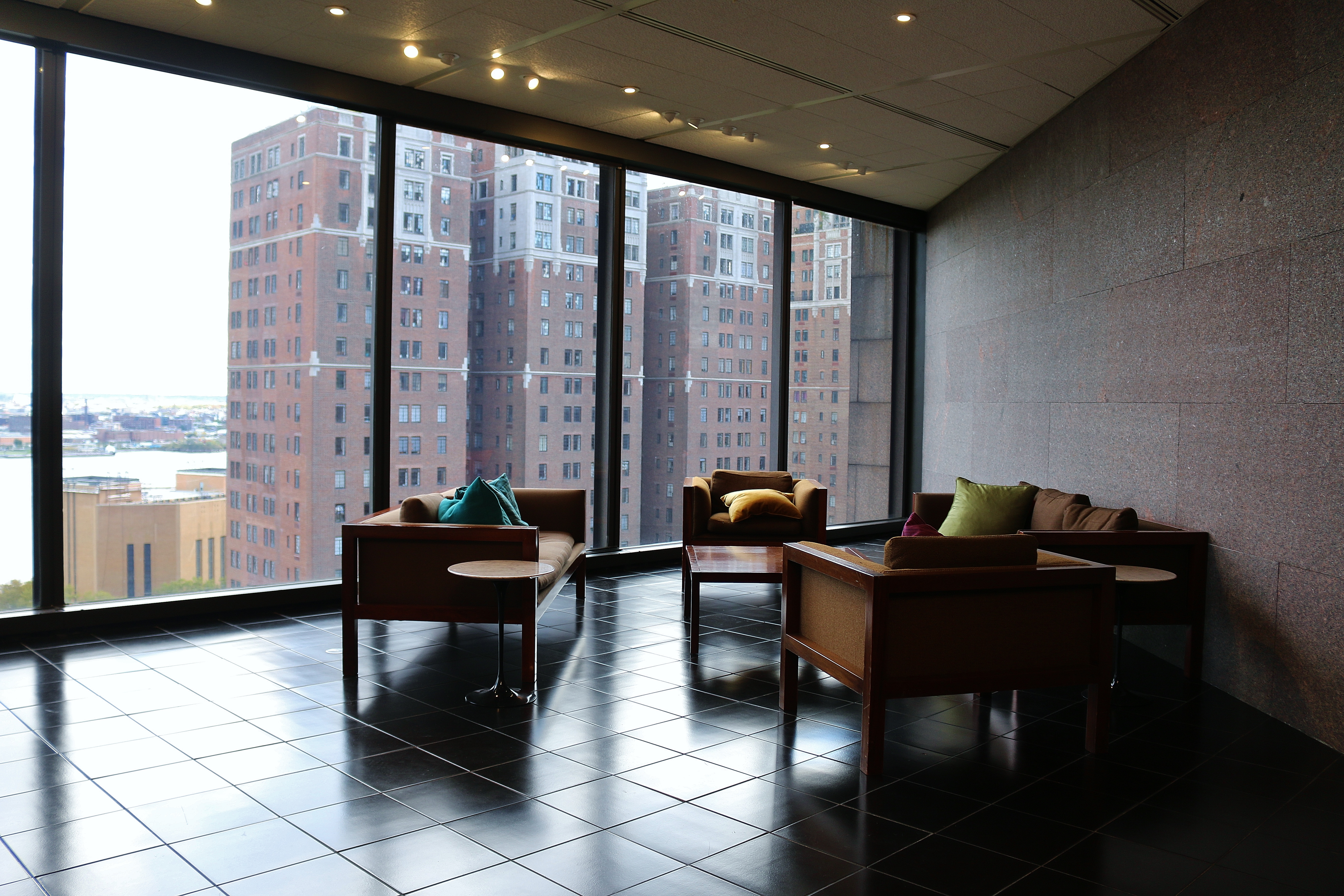
A conference room on the east side of the building

Offices were generally divided into a grid of 6-foot-wide (1.8 m) modules. The offices of department heads typically measured nine modules wide; lower-ranking officials had six-module-wide offices. Generally, senior employees occupied the offices facing the atrium, which Pelkonen called "a utopian suggestion suggesting a cathedral of labor". The effect was blunted by the presence of gypsum walls separating the private offices from the corridors behind them. In the late 2010s, these walls were replaced with 42-inch-high (110 cm) workstations, allowing a full view across the atrium.

The northern portions of the fourth through sixth stories are slightly set back behind the floors underneath them, creating three terraces facing the atrium. Planters were placed atop the terraces. The spaces have offices facing either the atrium or outside onto 43rd Street, allowing workers to see each other. Roche said: "It will be possible in this building to look across the court and see your fellow man [...] There will be a total awareness of the foundation's activities." Roche intended that the atrium's occupants "not think of themselves as separate from their colleagues". The offices and hallways facing the atrium had sliding doors and windows. The atrium's glass walls are interspersed with weathering steel, and I-beams support each floor. Although the atrium had been left partially exposed during construction, the weathering steel beams inside are rougher and lighter-colored than the beams outside.

The presidential office suite originally covered 2,535 square feet (235.5 m^{2}) but was divided into three conference rooms in the 2010s. As originally designed, the eleventh floor had a 130-foot-long (40 m) balcony overhanging the atrium. This balcony led to a reception room with mahogany panels on the walls that hid filing cabinets. The chief executive's suite was 895 square feet (83.1 m^{2}), containing a pantry and restroom. Another door led to a conference room, which could seat 40 people around a 12-foot-long (3.7 m) table with a leather surface. There was also a dining room on the 11th floor and a smaller executive dining room nearby, though the executive dining room was eliminated in the 2010s. To meet fire-safety regulations, the 11th floor was retrofitted with sprinklers, a fire curtain, and an exhaust system during a 2010s renovation.

==== Other interior spaces ====
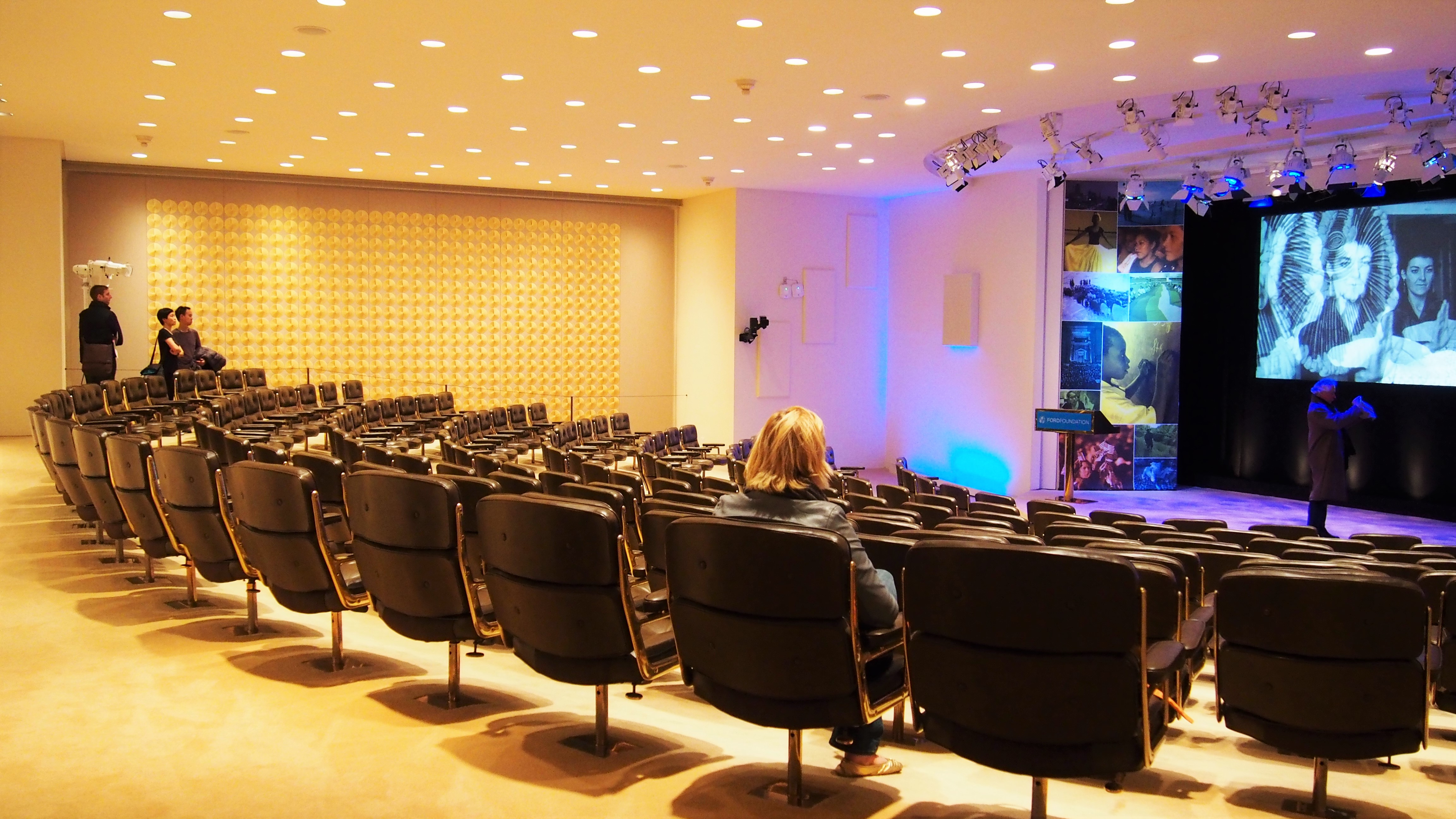
The basement auditorium

The elevators and one set of emergency stairs are on the western side of the building, near the northwest corner. Another set of emergency stairs is on the northeast corner. There are also emergency stairs within the diagonal piers on the eastern and southern sides of the building, at the ends of the northern and western wings, respectively. The Ford Foundation's library, which originally included 18,000 volumes, is located beneath the lobby. The basement has a conference room, along with an auditorium decorated with a tapestry by Sheila Hicks. There are 54,000 square feet (5,000 m^{2}) of event space, as well as an art gallery and office space, all of which can be rented out.

== History ==
The Ford Foundation was established in Michigan in 1936 as a foundation for the family of Henry Ford, who had founded the Ford Motor Company. In 1949, after a report by Horace Rowan Gaither, the foundation was reorganized to focus on economic improvements, education, freedom and democracy, human behavior, and world peace. By 1950, it was the largest private foundation in the United States, and its assets were valued at about $474 million. (Note: equivalent to $6,343 in 2025) The foundation had its main offices in Pasadena, California, and satellite offices in Detroit and New York City. The New York office was at 477 Madison Avenue, where the foundation leased either nine or ten floors. The New York location became the main office when the Pasadena location closed in 1953, and the foundation leased three more floors at 477 Madison Avenue the next year.

=== Planning and construction ===
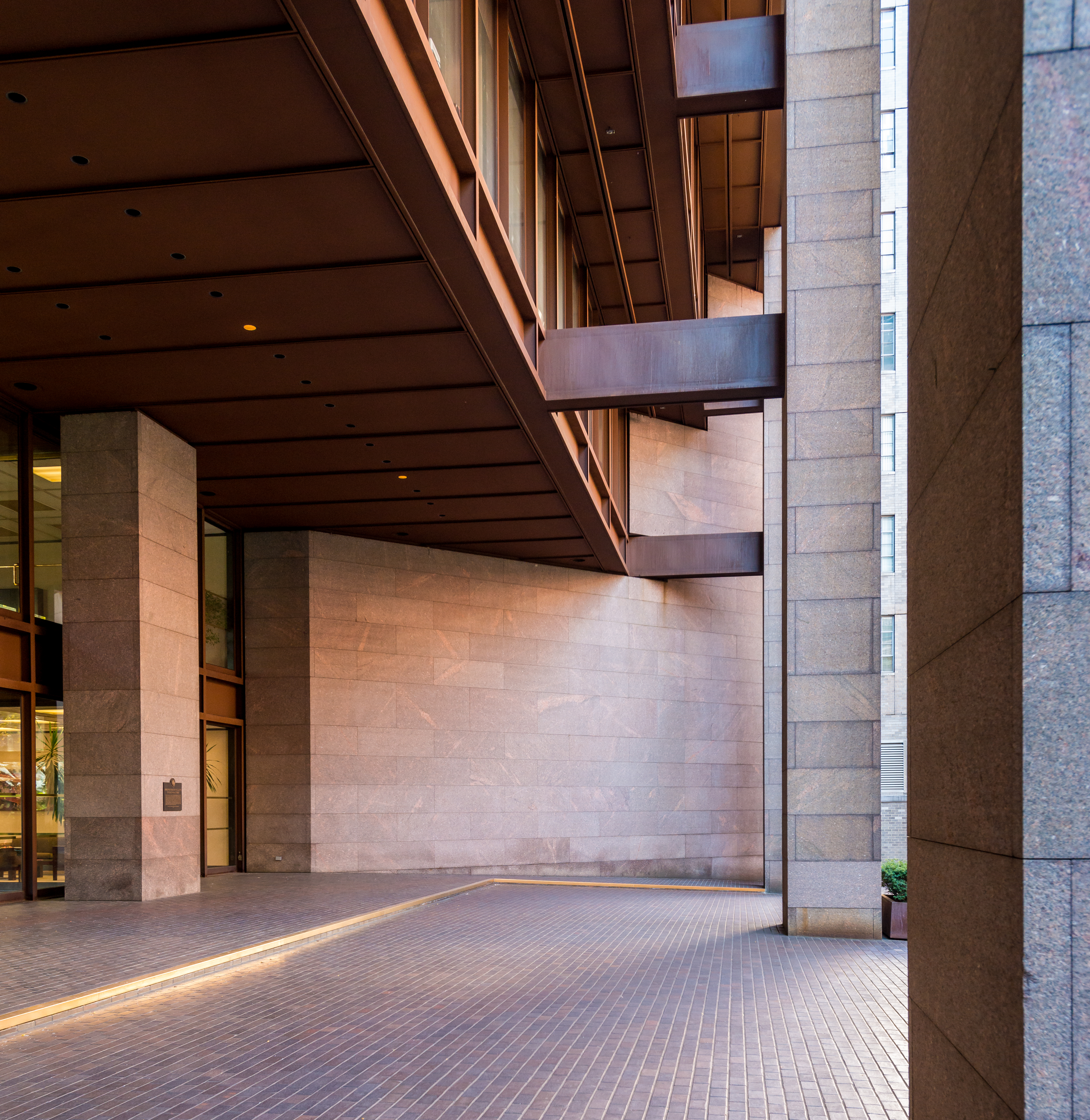
43rd Street entrance

The foundation's activities were changed in 1962 to focus on education, public, economic, and international affairs, as well as the arts and sciences. The next year, the foundation bought land facing 42nd and 43rd Streets for its headquarters, including the Hospital for the Ruptured and the Crippled. At the time, few private foundations were constructing prominent headquarters buildings, and there were many office structures being built along 42nd Street. The foundation's president at the time, Henry Townley Heald, had previously headed the Illinois Institute of Technology while its new campus was being built. The building was to be designed by Eero Saarinen Associates, whose leaders included John Dinkeloo and Kevin Roche. It was one of the first projects that Dinkeloo and Roche designed after the firm's previous head, Eero Saarinen, died. During the planning process, Roche created colorized diagrams of the site, which he presented to the Ford Foundation's leaders.

Final plans for the Ford Foundation Building were announced in September 1964 with a projected cost of $10 million. (Note: equivalent to $71.580 million in 2024) Construction was planned to begin the next month and finish in 1966. Rather than having the offices occupy all the space available under the city's zoning laws, Roche decided to include a large atrium, as he felt that most office buildings "tend to isolate the individual and store him away in a cubicle". In designing the building, Roche said: "It's really very important in that kind of community for each to be aware of the other, for their common aim to be reinforced." This philosophy influenced his decision to place offices only on two sides of the atrium. The construction process was supervised by Ralph Schwarz of the Ford Foundation. During construction in April 1967, a construction crane fell onto 42nd Street and injured four people. Work was also delayed by a plumbers' strike that lasted five months.

=== Usage ===
The Ford Foundation Building was dedicated on December 8, 1967; sources disagree over whether it cost about $16 million or $17 million. (Note: equivalent to $114.528–121.686 million in 2024) Though the building was intended to accommodate 600 workers, it initially housed 400 employees. It cost about $700,000 annually to maintain the building, (Note: equivalent to $5.011 million in 2024) including $70,000 just for the atrium garden. (Note: equivalent to $0.501 million in 2024) The foundation was exempt from paying property taxes to the city, which meant that the city forfeited about $1.2 million in annual revenue from the Ford Foundation. To offset this loss of tax income, the foundation agreed to make an annual payment in lieu of taxes of $1.2 million to the Fund for the City of New York, which distributed awards to public servants. Despite having designed the building, Roche visited it only "three or four times" in the four decades after its completion.

A conference room in the basement

Due to the design of the building's glass walls, only the windows on the lowest two floors could initially be cleaned, since window washers could access the facade only from the ground. The New York State Board of Standards and Appeals, which oversaw window-washing operations for buildings in the state, initially refused to approve a plan to clean the Ford Foundation Building's windows, which had gathered dust for two years. After the foundation modified the location of the window-washing terminals for safety reasons, the board approved a window-washing plan in 1969. In 1975, during the ongoing recession, the Ford Foundation laid off some employees and considered renting out office space in the building. The state government's 42nd Street Redevelopment Authority, which was tasked with overseeing the revival of a rundown theater district along West 42nd Street, leased space in the building in 1978. The foundation's grants decreased significantly during the recession, from $197 million in 1973 to $75.8 million in 1979, though it remained the largest private foundation in the U.S.

The New York City Landmarks Preservation Commission (LPC) considered designating the Ford Foundation Building's exterior and atrium as city landmarks in July 1997. The Ford Foundation Building, the Manufacturers Trust Company Building, and the CBS Building received landmark designations on October 21, 1997. The Landmarks Preservation Commission called the Ford Foundation Building "one of the most successful and admired modern buildings to emerge in New York City following World War II." For several years, it was the youngest building to have city landmark status, having been completed 30 years before its designation. (Note: New York City individual landmarks must be at least 30 years old at the time of their designation. The building was actually 29 years old at the time of its designation, given its completion date of December 8, 1967.) The design of the building, as well as its namesake's wealth, preserved it during the early 21st century, when several other 1960s-era structures by Roche and other architects were being destroyed.

In 2015, the Ford Foundation announced that the building would be renovated for $190 million. The building no longer complied with fire-safety codes, and the building would become environmentally friendly and compliant with the Americans with Disabilities Act of 1990. The LPC approved the plans in April 2016. During the renovation, the foundation moved to temporary offices nearby. Darren Walker, president of the Ford Foundation, wanted as many of the elements of the original structure to be preserved as possible, though the presidential suite would be removed to create a less imposing environment. The renovation also added some event space. The project, designed by architecture firm Gensler, was finished in late 2018 and cost $205 million. After the renovation was finished, the building was renamed the Ford Foundation Center for Social Justice, reflecting the addition of space for social-justice groups.

== Impact ==
=== Reception ===
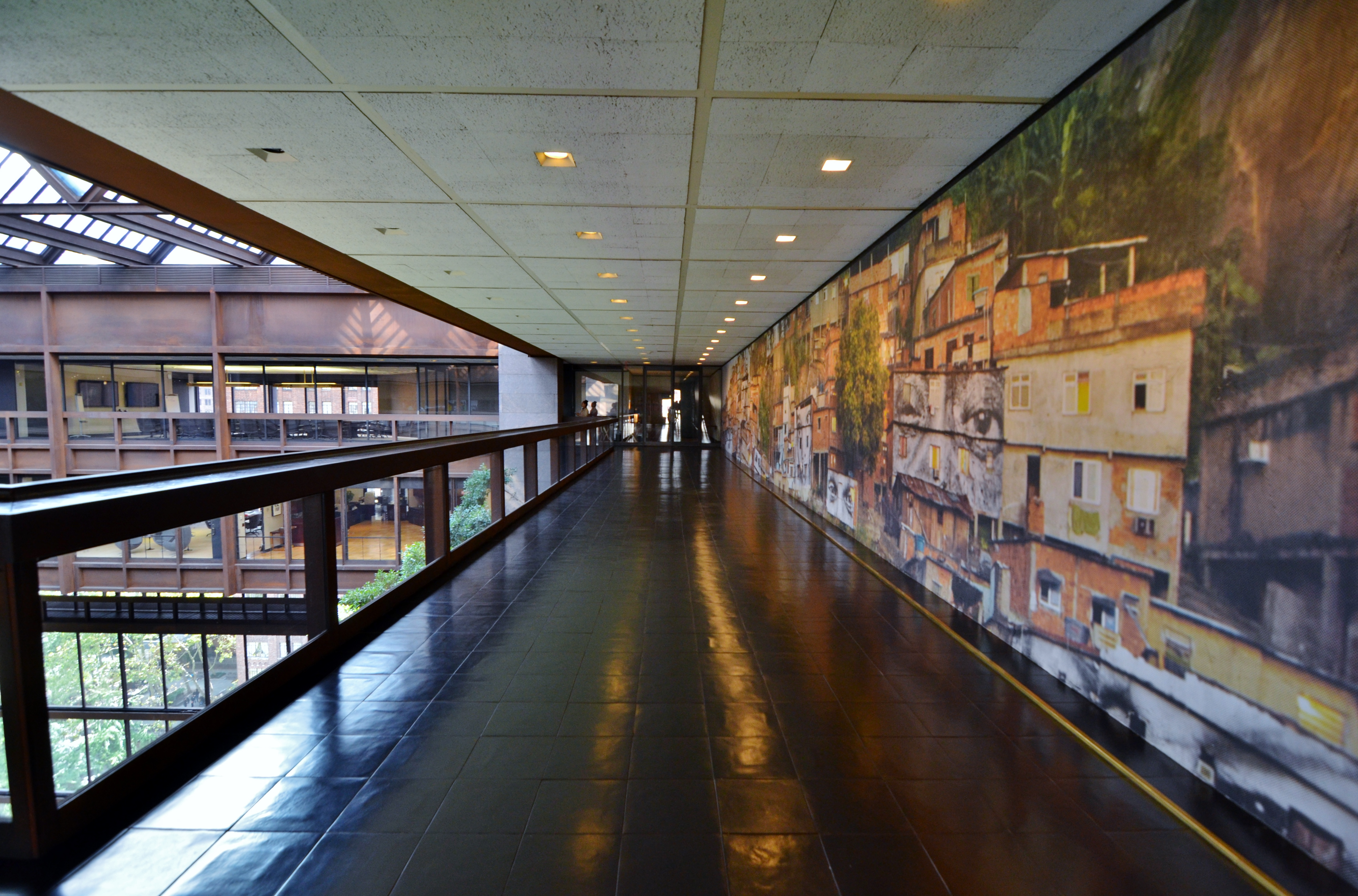
A footbridge on one of the upper stories

When the building was completed, Wolf Von Eckardt of The Washington Post characterized its design as challenging "sterile downtown architecture", particularly because its atrium was so different from other privately owned public spaces in the city, which he considered to be clichéd. According to Paul Goldberger of The New York Times, the Ford Foundation Building "established [Roche] firmly as a designer on his own", since previously his work had been associated mainly with Saarinen. Robert A. M. Stern and the co-authors of his 1995 book New York 1960 said the Ford Foundation Building and the Socony-Mobil Building were the only two "buildings of unquestioned distinction erected along Forty-second Street in the postwar era". Ada Louise Huxtable and Herbert Muschamp of The New York Times both praised the excellence of the design.

Commentators stated that the Ford Foundation Building's design deviated from that of major corporate headquarters. One observer, James Burns Jr., said that "this building could not and would not have been built by a corporation", citing the Seagram Building, Lever House, and CBS Building as instances of corporate structures with distinctive designs. Detractors claimed that the design was too costly for the headquarters of a nonprofit organization. The building was also described as lacking intimacy, and the atrium was derided as a "waste" of space.

The Ford Foundation Building was also characterized as a symbol. Goldberger said the building's "very presence [...] benefits the entire city", and William Zinsser described it as "an act of faith in the midst of ruin". Another New York Times critic said the "design concept is [a] fresh and radical change from the four-sided, glassed-in box". The critic Jonathan Barnett described the building's cube-like form as "an ancient symbol of power" similar to that used in religious institutions. Justin Davidson wrote for New York magazine in 2017: "The Ford Foundation has an imposing look of perpetuity. The foundation's mission is to battle the full panoply of timeless injustices around the world, and its home base is a see-through fortress, braced for an endless war."

After the 2018 renovation, Archpaper said "you'd never know the crisp and clean, 415,000-square-foot building felt darker and smaller just four years ago." Metropolis magazine said "The reimagining is refreshingly restrained and in keeping with Roche Dinkeloo's original tailored look and feel". A Times reporter stated that the design had been "a Mad Men-era version of a Gesamtkunstwerk, a complete work of art", and said after the renovation that "Roche and Dinkeloo's geometry sings again". After Roche's death the following year, Goldberger said in the Times that the building had managed to combine Kiley's atrium with Roche's predilection for steel, masonry, and glass.

==== Atrium commentary ====
The atrium was also the subject of acclaim and inspired the inclusion of indoor gardens in other buildings citywide. Goldberger called the atrium "one of the city's most spectacular interior spaces", and Barnett called it a gift to the city. Vincent Scully characterized the structure as having a "military scale" with a "sultanic inner garden". A critic wrote for Artforum that Roche and Dinkeloo had "pioneered the use of private space as a public amenity". Olga Gueft wrote for Interiors magazine that the atrium's terrain and pathways were interesting to explore, and Huxtable characterized it as "probably one of the most romantic environments ever devised by corporate man". The Baltimore Sun wrote in 1984 that the Ford Foundation Building had been Manhattan's first "atrium building". In the years after the building was finished, planted atriums became commonplace additions in late-20th-century office and hotel buildings.

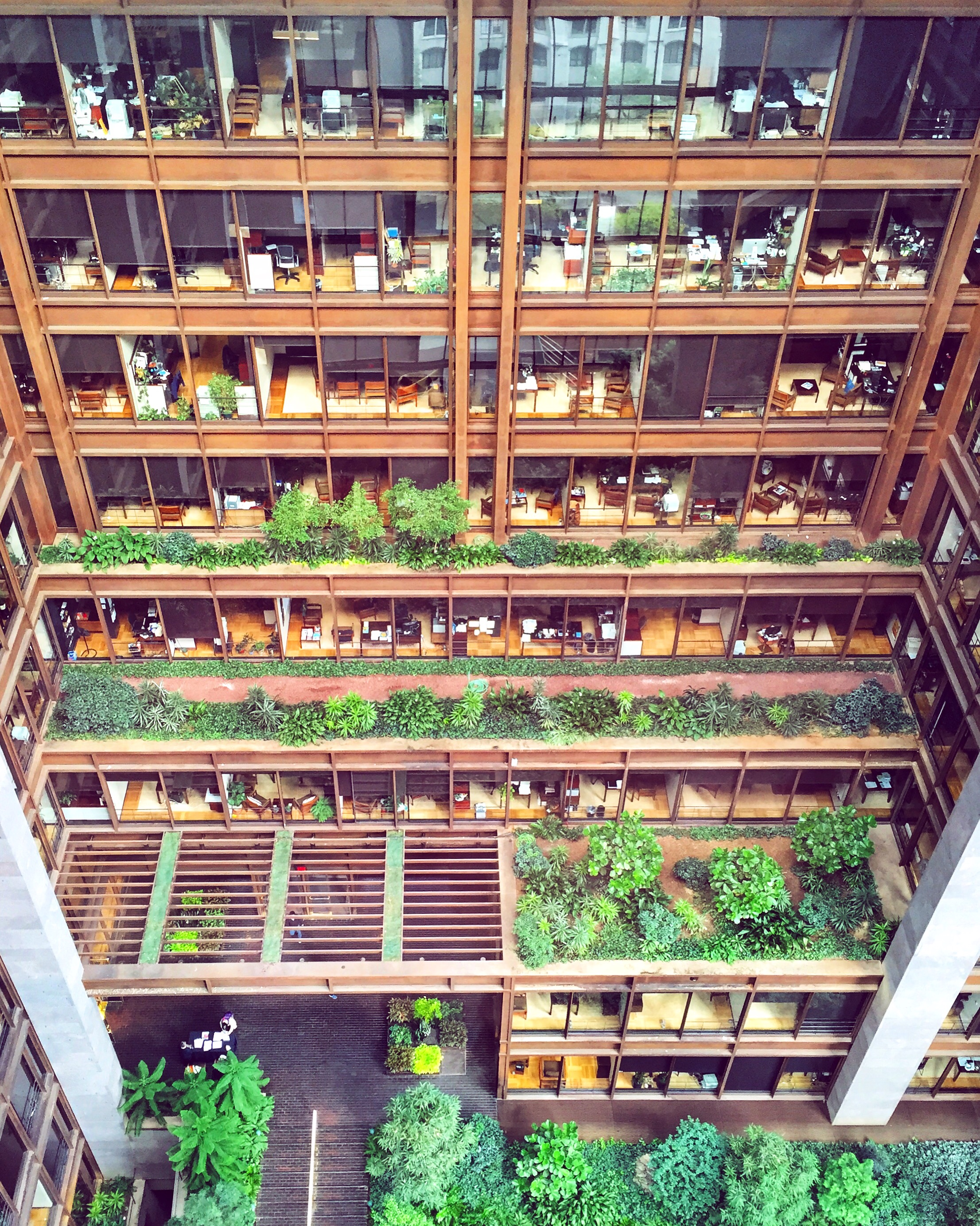
Some publications characterized the atrium as pragmatic because it provided fresh air to the offices.

Some publications, such as the first edition of the American Institute of Architects' (AIA) Guide to New York City and Interiors magazine, characterized the atrium as pragmatic because it provided fresh air to the offices. A writer in the British magazine Country Life said that the atrium probably inspired enthusiasm for the headquarters' opening because it was one of the relatively few areas of greenery in Midtown Manhattan, and The Baltimore Sun called the atrium "Eden in Manhattan". Muschamp wrote that the atrium was unwelcoming compared to the contemporary Paley Park in Midtown, and the critic Emily Genauer said that she felt "an oppressive and breathless sense of enclosure in a mammoth terrarium", saying its design could be domineering toward employees who had to see it every day.

=== Awards ===
The design won several architectural accolades as well. In 1968, the Ford Foundation Building and Paley Park shared an Albert S. Bard Civic Award, distributed to structures that exhibited "excellence in architecture and urban design". The same year, the local civic group Fifth Avenue Association gave the Ford Foundation Building and the Whitney Museum's Madison Avenue building a "Wish You Were Here" urban-design award. The building also won the AIA Twenty-five Year Award in 1995. A year before the building became a city landmark in 1997, the architect Robert A. M. Stern described the Ford Foundation Building as one of his favorites, out of 35 structures that he thought should have city landmark status.

== See also ==
- Architecture of New York City
- List of New York City Designated Landmarks in Manhattan from 14th to 59th Streets
