= Miami Beach Botanical Garden =

Urban green space in Miami Beach, Florida

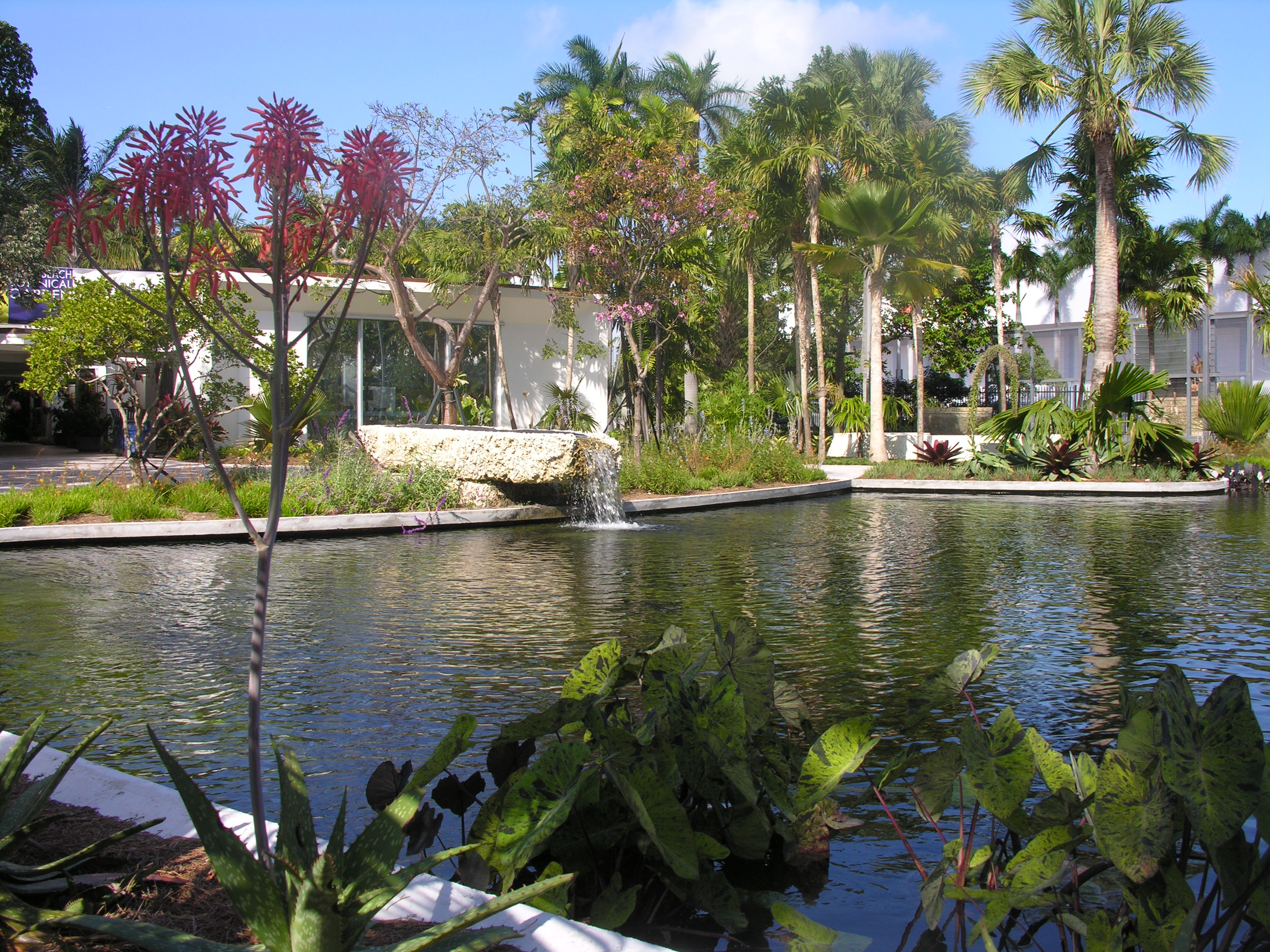
- The main pond at the Miami Beach Botanical Garden

- Location within Florida
- Type: Botanical
- Coordinates: 25°47′44.9″N 80°08′08.5″W
- Area: 2.6 acres (1.1 ha)
- Opened: 1962
- Owner: City of Miami Beach
- Website: mbgarden.org

The Miami Beach Botanical Garden is a 2.6 acres (1.1 ha) urban green space in Miami Beach, Florida founded in 1962. It was transformed in 2011 with a $1.2 million landscape renovation designed by South Florida landscape architect Raymond Jungles. The new landscape showcases native Florida plants and trees including bromeliads, palms, cycad, orchids and many others. There is a Japanese garden, native garden and bioswale, and water gardens including ponds, fountains, and a wetland with mangrove and pond apple trees.

The renovation also expanded the Great Lawn area for corporate and social events, established a plant nursery and event plaza, and enhanced the night-time lights, entrance gate, and pathways. The Garden offers free admission and is open Tuesday to Sunday from 9 a.m. to 5 p.m.

== History ==
In 1962, the City of Miami Beach created the "Garden Center" on a vacant site opposite the Miami Beach Convention Center built in 1957. Operated then as a City park, the Garden was situated on the historic Collins Canal, an integral part of the beginnings of Miami Beach. In the early 1900s pioneer John S. Collins dug the canal to transport mangoes and avocados, then called alligator pears by boat to the Port of Miami from groves along what is now Pinetree Drive. In the 1920s pioneer Carl Fisher developed Lincoln Road, luxury hotels such as the Flamingo and the Nautilus with polo fields and golf courses. The Garden site was originally a golf course.

By 1922 Miami Beach boasted the largest avocado and mango groves in the world, but Miami's agricultural roots would not last much longer, sacrificed for the tourist trade. Tourism has long been a driving force in Miami Beach, but the City also experienced the impact of economic recessions, World Wars, and destructive hurricanes. The Garden had sadly deteriorated before the Art Deco renaissance of the 1980s and after Hurricane Andrew in 1992. A group of residents approached the City in 1996 to create the Miami Beach Garden Conservancy as a non-profit organization with a mission to restore the Garden. Today's Miami Beach Botanical Garden is a public/private partnership, owned by the City of Miami Beach. The Garden has again become a dynamic venue for arts and cultural programming, environmental education and cultural tourism.

== Mission ==
The mission of the Miami Beach Botanical Garden is to promote environmental enjoyment, stewardship and sustainability through education, the arts, and interaction with the natural world. The garden is a unique, subtropical oasis of beauty and tranquility within an urban setting—a community resource that refreshes, inspires and engages our visitors.

== Miami Beach Garden Club ==
The Miami Beach Garden Club is a non-profit organization affiliated with the Florida Federations of Garden Clubs. The organization promotes the cultivation of plants and flowers within the community through projects that focus on: beautification of Miami Beach; mentoring and sponsoring student programs both locally and statewide; and support of the Miami Beach Botanical Garden. The Miami Beach Garden club also works with local Girl Scouts and school children at multiple local schools by continuing to expand their knowledge through monthly programs.

== Japanese Garden ==
One of the main features of the Miami Beach Botanical Garden is its Japanese Garden. This tranquil corner of the garden is defined by a red lacquered bridge spanning a quiet pond dotted with water lilies. Stone lanterns stand among the plantings based on the principles of Feng shui, where specific orientation and placing of certain elements helps to capture the energy and spirit of nature. Significant plantings here include the red powder puff shrub (Calliandra haematocephala), golden trumpet tree (Tabebuia caribea), and various types of tropical bamboo.

== Water Features ==
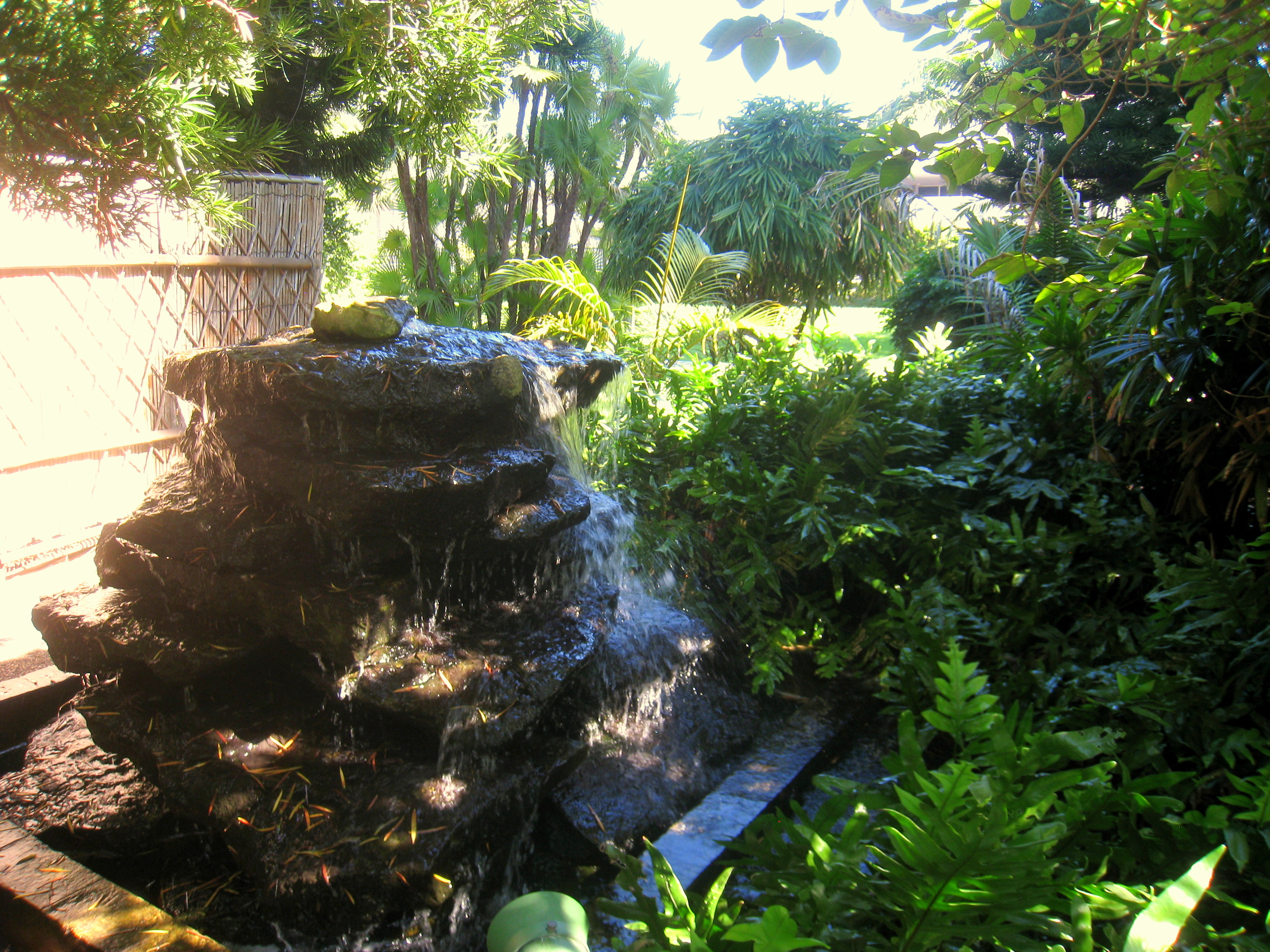
Cascading stone water fountain.

Water is a focal point in all areas of the garden. According to the garden's landscape architect Raymond Jungles, the element of water is significant because it "brings the sky into the garden, animates the space, reflects the landscape, and cools the areas directly around the buildings. Water magnifies the garden's sense of scale."

Outside the offices is a refurbished fountain designed by Morris Lapidus. Beyond the fountain is the main pond with a cascading oolite fountain and flowering water lilies. The adjoining wetland contains red mangroves, pond apple trees (Annona glabra), and rush grasses. During the day you can see dragonflies, koi, and if you're lucky, one very shy turtle roaming the waters.

== Edible Garden ==
The edible garden remains a reliable source of sustenance and natural beauty. It was made possible in part by the local chapter of Les Dames d'Escoffier: an international organization of women in the field of food, drink and gastronomy. This tropical edible garden contains pineapples (Ananas comosus), pomegranates (Punica granatum), coffee (Coffea arabica), and even raspberries. Often, the staff harvests fresh food and herbs from the garden to supplement workshops, mixers and other events.

== Gallery ==
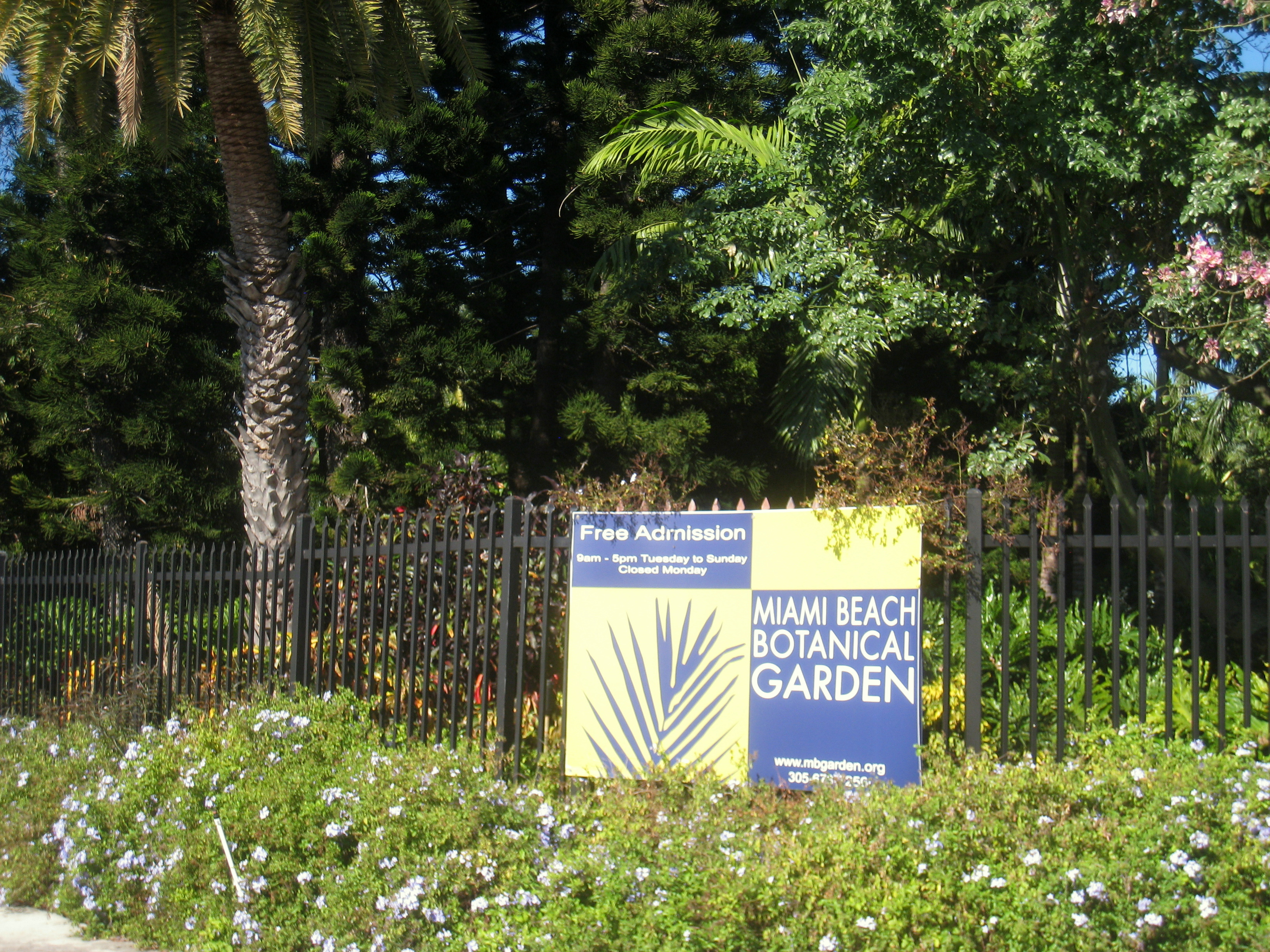
Entrance area.

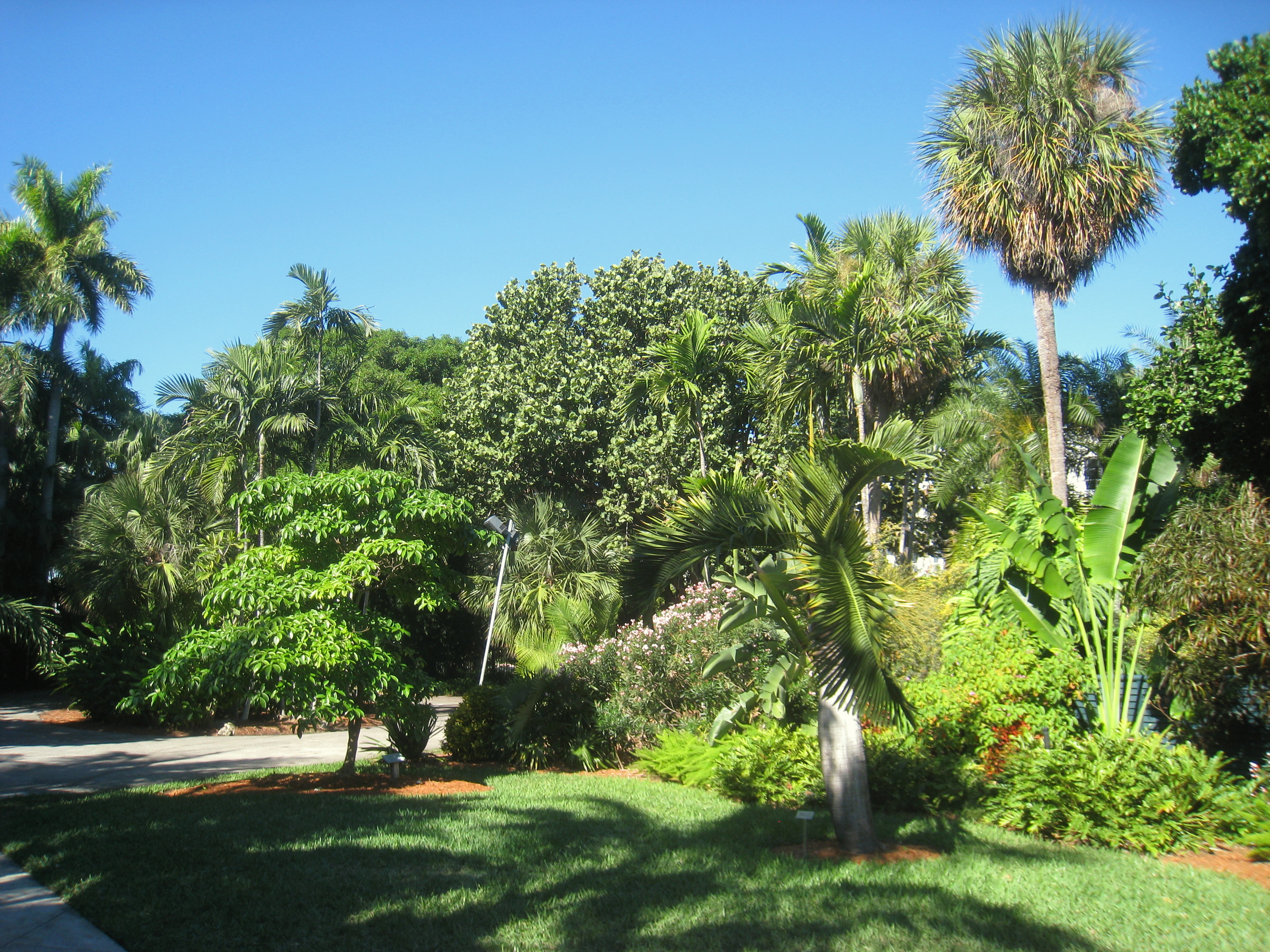
One of the paths in the garden.

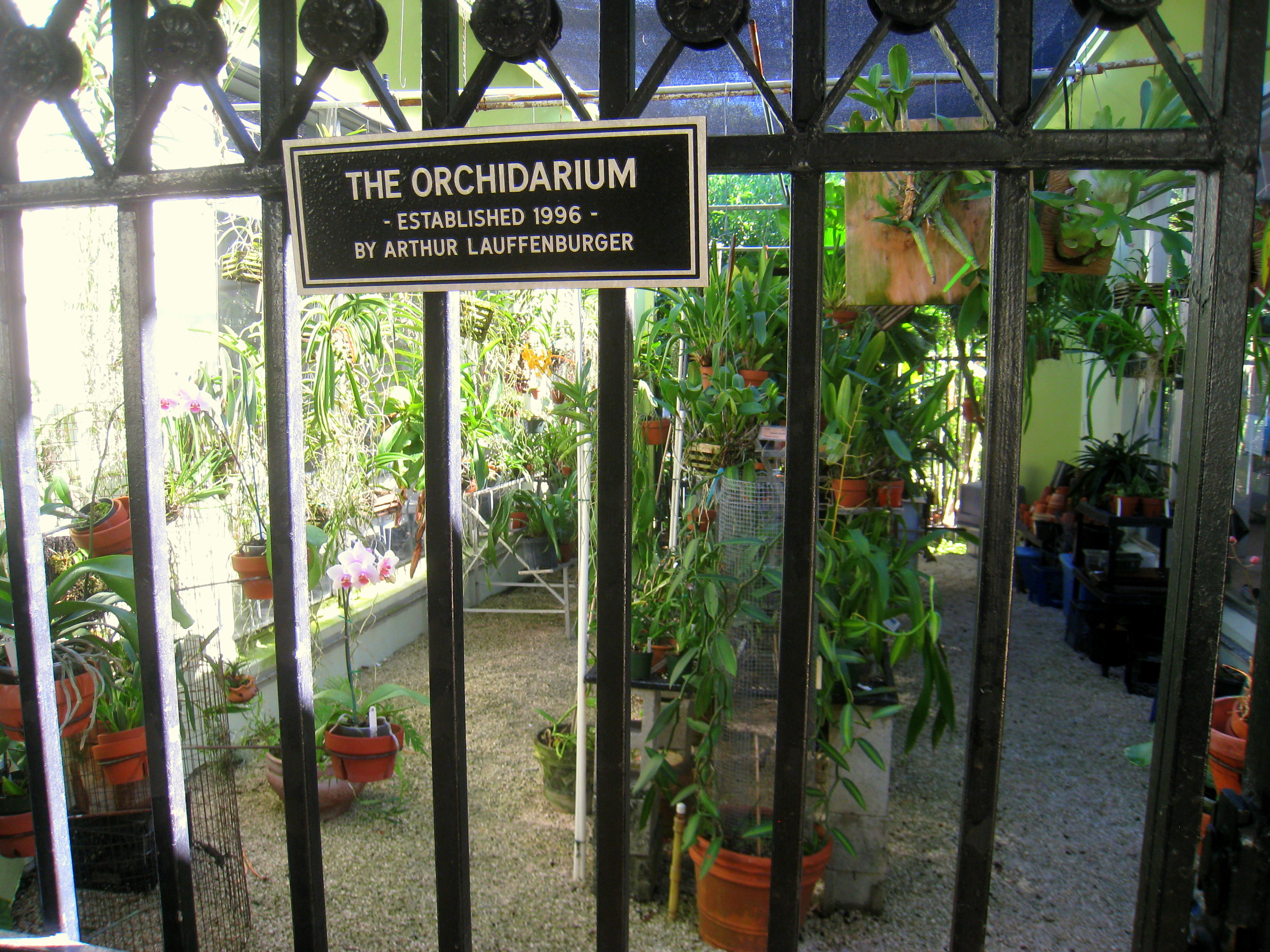
The Orchidarium.

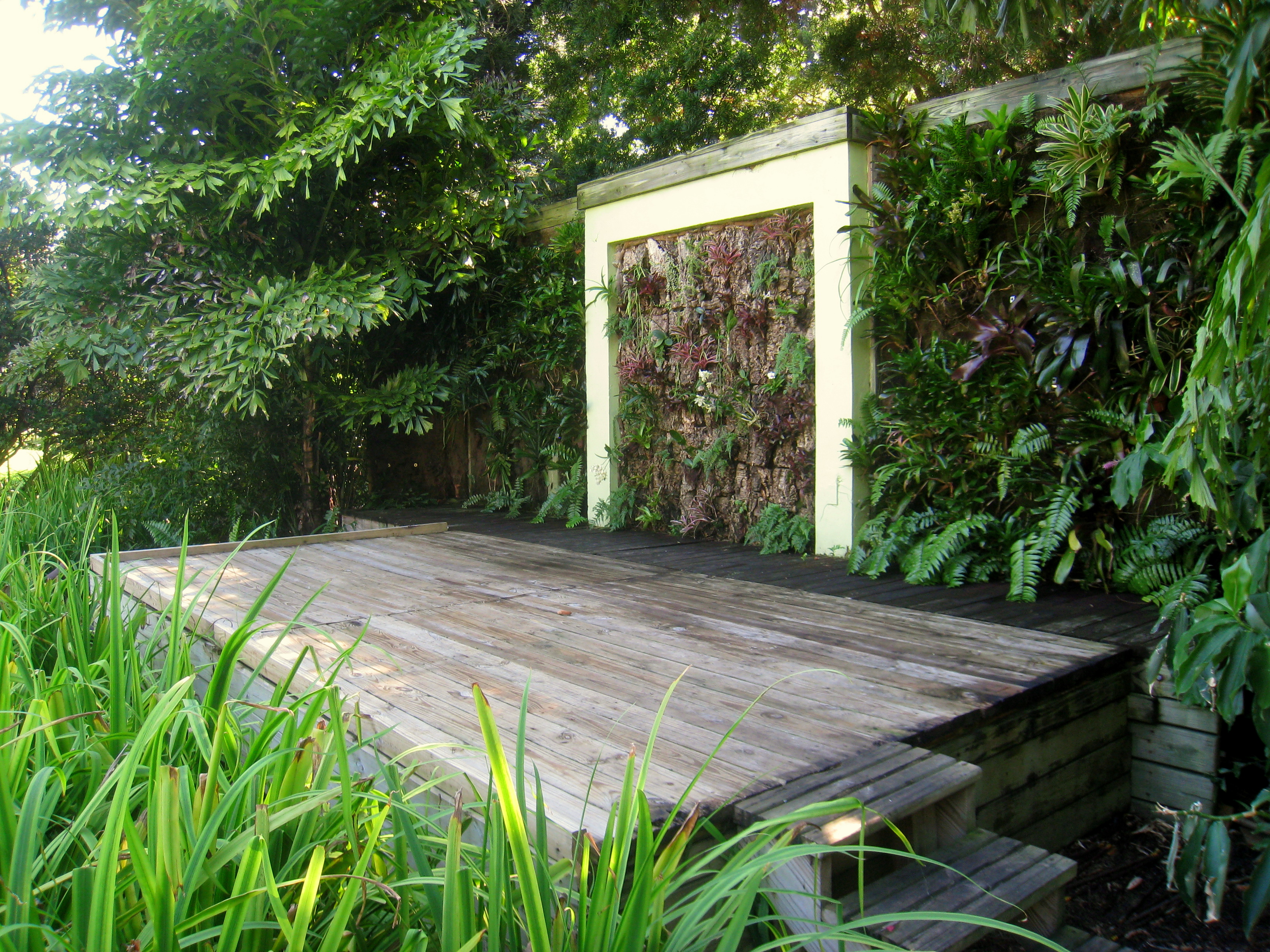
Small stage for events.

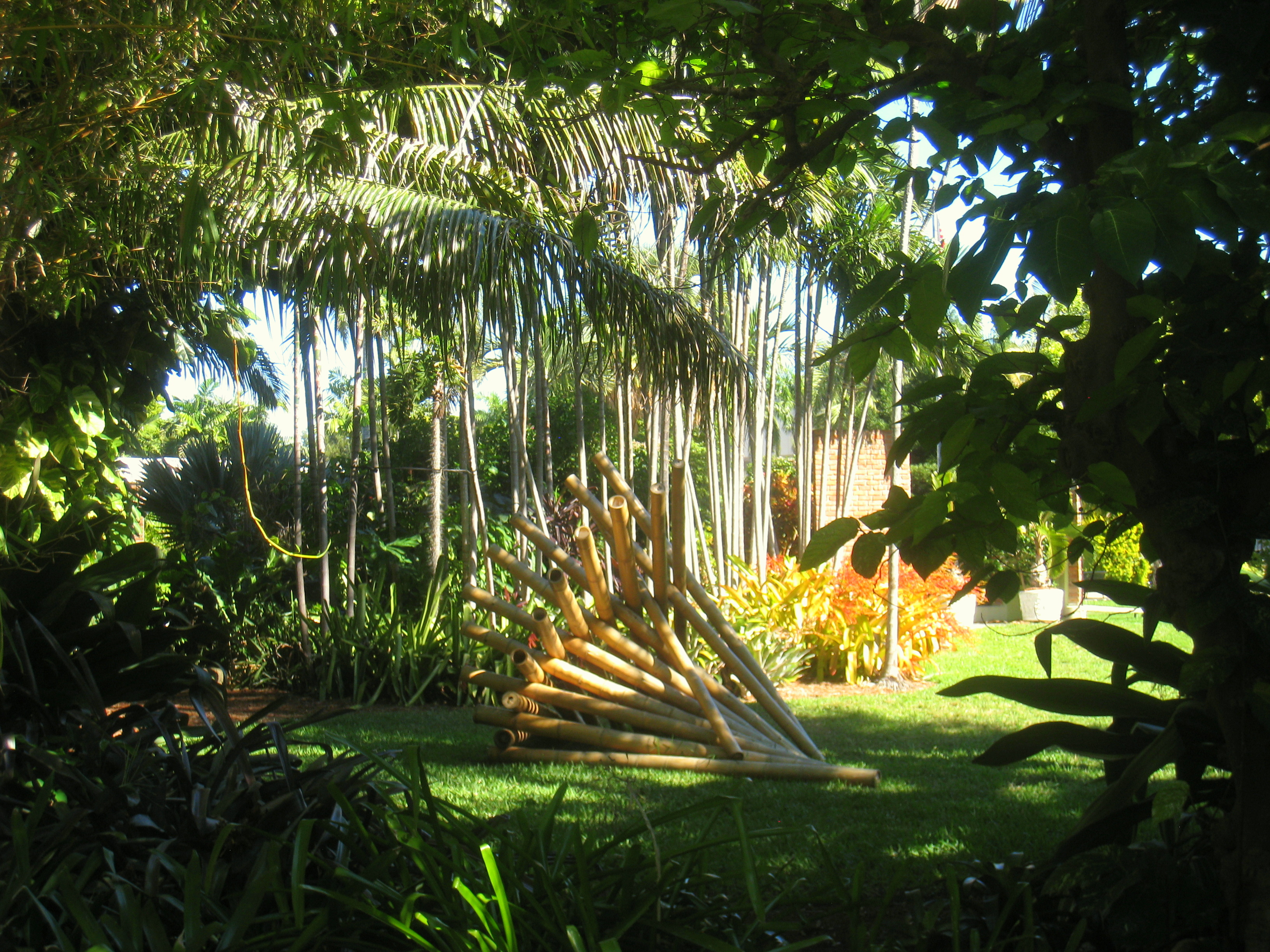
Artwork in the garden.

== See also ==
- List of botanical gardens in the United States
