= Raymond Jungles =

American landscape architect

Raymond Jungles is an American landscape architect and founder of Raymond Jungles Inc. in Miami, Florida. Jungles primarily focuses on private gardens and resort hotels in Florida and the Caribbean region. The American Society of Landscape Architects has honored Jungles with thirty-five design awards and the University of Florida named him its Most Distinguished Alumni in 2000. Two of his earliest influences are Luis Barragán and Roberto Burle Marx.

== Corporation ==
Raymond Jungles Inc. is a landscape architecture firm located in Miami, Florida. The company was founded in 1982 by Jungles and has maintained an international presence in landscape architecture focusing on residential, hospitality, master plan, and public work.

== Professional accomplishments ==
- 2005 Award of Excellence / Florida Chapter, ASLA /
- 2001 Frederic B. Stresau Award of Excellence / Florida Chapter, ASLA / Dunn Garden Award of Excellence / Florida Chapter, ASLA / Hyatt Windward Point Resort
- "Landscape Architect of the Year" / Miami Chapter, American Institute of Architects
- 2001 Frederic B. Stresau Award of Excellence / Florida Chapter, ASLA/Island Modern
- 2024 ASLA Design Medal for Landscape Architecture
